= List of largest galaxies =

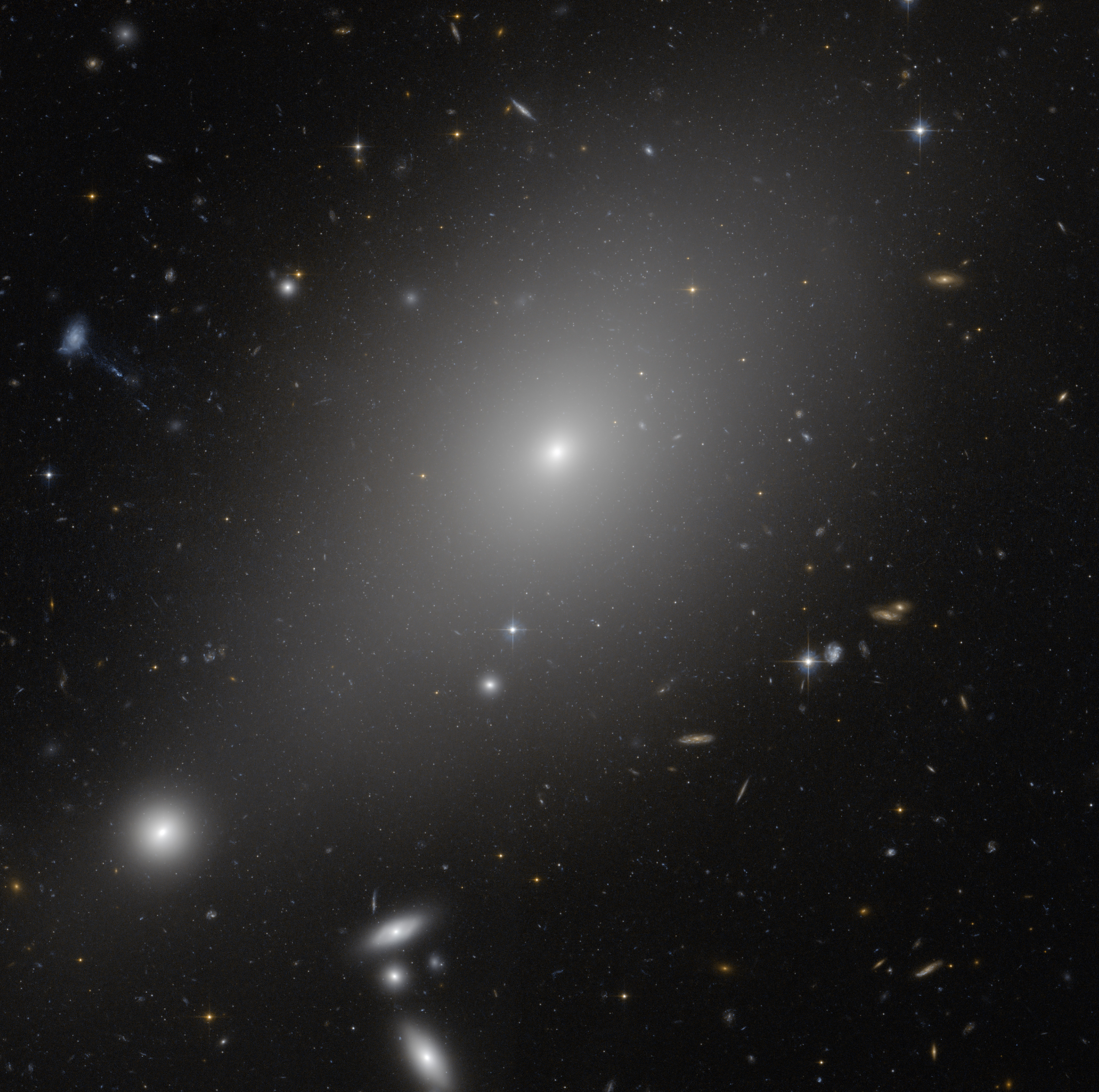
A Hubble Space Telescope image of the supergiant elliptical galaxy ESO 306-17. Supergiant elliptical galaxies are some of the largest galaxies known.

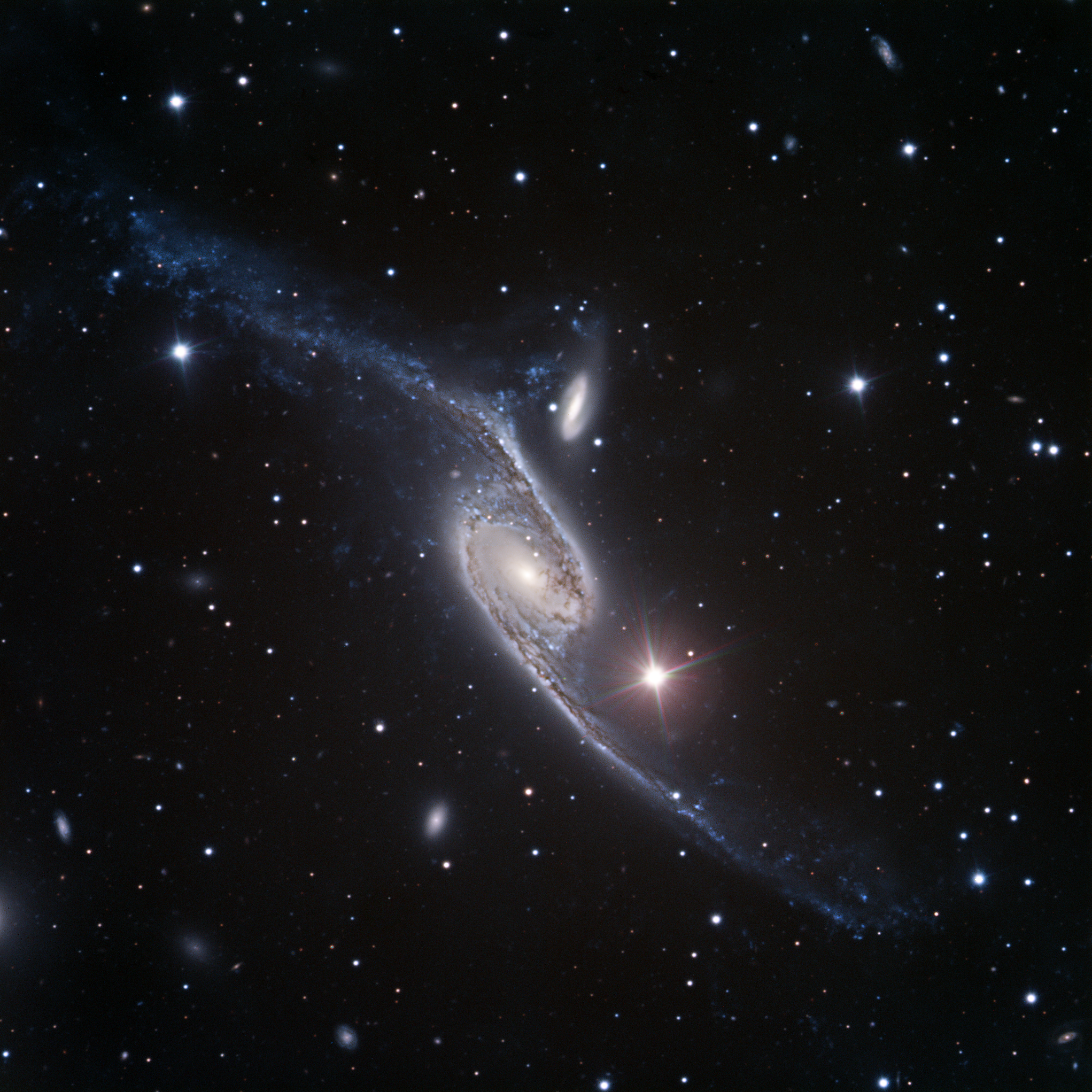
The Condor Galaxy is a colossal spiral galaxy disturbed by the smaller IC 4970. It is the largest known spiral galaxy with the isophotal diameter of over 717,000 light-years (220 kiloparsecs).

This is a list of largest galaxies known, sorted by order of increasing major axis diameters. The unit of measurement used is the light-year (approximately 9.46×10^{12} kilometers).

== Overview ==
Galaxies are vast collections of stars, planets, nebulae and other objects that are surrounded by an interstellar medium and held together by gravity. They do not have a definite boundary by nature, and are characterized with gradually decreasing stellar density as a function of increasing distance from its center. Because of this, measuring the sizes of galaxies can often be difficult and have a wide range of results depending on the sensitivity of the detection equipment and the methodology being used. Some galaxies emit more strongly in wavelengths outside the visible spectrum, depending on its stellar population, whose stars may emit more strongly in other wavelengths that are beyond the detection range. It is also important to consider the morphology of the galaxy when attempting to measure its size – an issue that has been raised by the Russian astrophysicist B.A. Vorontsov-Vel'Yaminov in 1961, which considers separate determination methods in measuring the sizes of spiral and elliptical galaxies.

For a full context about how the diameters of galaxies are measured, including the estimation methods stated in this list, see Galaxy § Physical diameters.

== List ==
Listed below are galaxies with diameters greater than 700,000 light-years. This list uses the mean cosmological parameters of the Lambda-CDM model based on results from the 2015 Planck collaboration, where H_{0} = 67.74 km/s/Mpc, Ω_{Λ} = 0.6911, and Ω_{m} = 0.3089. Due to different techniques, each figure listed on the galaxies has varying degrees of confidence in them. The reference to those sizes plus further additional details can be accessed by clicking the link for the NASA/IPAC Extragalactic Database (NED) on the right-hand side of the table.

Galaxies with diameters greater than 700,000 light-years
Galaxy name/designation	Image	Major axis diameter (in light-years)	Minor axis diameter (in light years)	Morphology	Estimation method	Link for object
ESO 071-009 (ESO 071-G 009)		2,867,000	261,000	Sc?	90% total B-light	NED
LEDA 2222102		1,919,000	1,919,000	BrClG	2MASS K-band total mag	NED
WISEA J091319.48+194212.0		1,810,000	157,400	~	25.0 B-mag arcsec^{−2}	NED
ESO 383-76 (ESO 383-G 076) (Note: The physical diameters given by NED for this object are based on the mean of one or more redshift-independent distance techniques, which are subject to errors and sensitivity to extreme values. The diameters given for this object in this list was based on NED's provided scale "Virgo + GA + Shapley" multiplied with the values for the angular diameter of the cited estimation method.)		1,764,000	882,100	cD5; E5; BrClG	90% total B-light	NED
ESO 248-6 (ESO 248-G 006)		1,731,000	830,700	S0?; BrClG	90% total B-light	NED
IC 1101		1,696,000	~	cD; S0^{−}	~30 B-mag arcsec^{−2}	
2MASX J09472275+3447065		1,651,000	297,000	~	2MASS K-band total mag	NED
2MFGC 07954		1,459,000	291,800	~	2MASS K-band total mag	NED
ESO 409-25 (ESO 409-G 025)		1,454,000	901,700	cD4; E4; BrClG	90% total B-light	NED
ESO 256-11		1,424,000	594,100	SA0^0(s)?	90% total B-light	NED
2MASX J11095615+1427190		1,295,000	984,000	~	2MASS K-band total mag	NED
Abell 3039 BCG B		1,290,000	438,600	cD	2MASS K-band total mag	NED
CGCG 014-042 NED01		1,249,000	694,000	Sc	2MASS K-band total mag	NED
ESO 347-9 (ESO 347-G 009)		1,212,000	436,300	S...; cD	90% total B-light	NED
ESO 73-IG 2 (ESO 073-IG 002)		1,210,000	996,000	compact	27.0 B-mag arcsec^{−2}	NED
OGC 768		1,194,000	1,194,000	BrClG	2MASS K-band total mag	NED
SPT-CL J0500-5116 BCG		1,161,000	1,161,000	cD m	2MASS K-band total mag	NED
PSZ1 G171.96-40.64 BCG		1,143,000	1,143,000	~	2MASS K-band total mag	NED
2MASX J14102504+6337103		1,134,000	1,134,000	~ (Note: Morphology unlisted; images show an elliptical galaxy.)	2MASS K-band total mag	NED
ESO 151-41 (ESO 151-G 041)		1,132,000	453,000	Sc	90% total B-light	NED
2MFGC 00286		1,126,000	329,000	~	2MASS K-band total mag	NED
ESO 539-13 NED03 (ESO 539-G 013 NED03)		1,106,000	1,115,000	E	27.0 B-mag arcsec^{−2}	NED
2MASX J11232449+1511041		1,086,000	442,100	~	2MASS K-band total mag	NED
Abell 1576 BCG		1,077,000	517,200	cD db	2MASS K-band total mag	NED
GMBCG J178.01905+37.01011 BCG		1,074,000	~	BrClG	2MASS K-band total mag	NED
ESO 306-17 (ESO 306-G 017)		1,070,000	706,100	cD3; E3	90% total B-light	NED
B2 0247+29		1,058,000	~	~	2MASS K-band total mag	NED
ESO 350-15 (ESO 350-G 015)		1,043,000	521,600	cD3; E3	90% total B-light	NED
2MASX J08510173+1638570		1,040,000	~	BrClG	2MASS K-band total mag	NED
ZwCl 1305.4+2941 BCG		1,036,000	403,900	BrClG	2MASS K-band total mag	NED
Abell 2397 BCG		1,014,000	588,300	cD	2MASS K-band total mag	NED
Abell 1146 BCG		1,009,000	767,100	E	2MASS K-band total mag	NED
Abell 747 BCG		995,300	437,900	BrClG	2MASS K-band total mag	NED
LEDA 1273002		975,400	419,400	BrClG	2MASS K-band total mag	NED
WHL J021032.6-010125 BCG		972,400	972,400	BrClG	2MASS K-band total mag	NED
6C B084407.8+582055		967,200	~	BrCIG	2MASS K-band total mag	NED
LEDA 1838034		958,600	517,700	BrClG	2MASS K-band total mag	NED
ACT-CL J0707-5522 BCG		957,300	957,300	~	2MASS K-band total mag	NED
LEDA 1453633		949,900	~	BrClG	2MASS K-band total mag	NED
LEDA 1987660		947,000	~	BrClG	2MASS K-band total mag	NED
SPT-CL J0129-6432 BCG		946,300	946,300	~	2MASS K-band total	NED
ESO 473-5 (ESO 473-G 005)		944,600	517,700	Sc; BrClG	90% total B-light	NED
LEDA 2011796		940,600	~	~	2MASS K-band total mag	NED
Abell 1942 BCG		939,200	638,700	BrClG; AGN	2MASS K-band total mag	NED
2MASX J15264270+1647386		938,500	938,500	BrClG	2MASS K-band total mag	NED
2MASX J12114313+0801071		933,900	467,000	~	2MASS K-band total mag	NED
MCG +09-25-047		932,900	205,300	~	Intermediate surface brightness	NED
ESO 349-3 (ESO 349-G 003)		919,700	671,400	(R')SA(rs)cd	90% total B-light	NED
2MASX J00031162-0605305		918,100	~	~	2MASS K-band total mag	NED
LEDA 1654342		916,400	623,100	BrClG	2MASS K-band total mag	NED
ESO 156-18 (ESO 156-G 018)		916,000	421,400	SAB(s)0^{0}: pec	90% total B-light	NED
OGC 169		915,700	659,300	BrClG	2MASS K-band total mag	NED
GMBCG J223.42143+21.54648 BCG		914,500	914,500	BrClG	2MASS K-band total mag	NED
Abell 384 BCG		913,900	274,200	~	2MASS K-band total mag	NED
ESO 206-2 (ESO 206-G 002)		913,600	420,300	cD; S	90% total B-light	NED
ESO 286-41 (ESO 286-G 041)		897,000	502,300	SA(s)0^{+}; cD	90% total B-light	NED
2MFGC 01370		891,200	891,200	AGN	2MASS K-band total mag	NED
2MASX J10085922+1937154		886,100	~	~	2MASS K-band total mag	NED
Abell 697 BCG		885,200	637,400	BrClG	2MASS K-band total mag	NED
OGC 511		883,100	618,400	BrClG	2MASS K-band total mag	NED
Abell 3300 BCG		878,800	386,700	cD	2MASS K-band total mag	NED
OGC 666		876,300	455,700	BrClG	2MASS K-band total mag	NED
OGC 233		875,500	~	BrClG	2MASS K-band total mag	NED
2MASX J11140115+0458199		874,200	~	BrClG	2MASS K-band total mag	NED
SDSS J122944.80+133454.2		873,200	~	~	0.5-7 keV Chandra	NED
OGC 815		871,800	~	E;BrClG	2-7 keV Chandra	NED
WHL J230800.9-015541 BCG		869,400	~	~	2MASS K-band total mag	NED
Abell 1437B BCG		868,300	538,400	BrClG	2MASS K-band total mag	NED
OGC 116		868,100	538,200	BrClG	2MASS K-band total mag	NED
ESO 443-11 (ESO 443-G 011)		866,500	407,300	cD; SAB0^{0} pec; BrClG	27.0 B-mag arcsec^{−2}	NED
QSO J0931+3204		865,600 (Note: Has 14 million light year radio lobes, however they are not considered a part of the galaxy.)	398,200	~	2MASS K-band total mag	NED
4C +41.26		862,300	724,400	BrClG	2MASS K-band total mag	NED
LEDA 1633166		852,700	~	~	2MASS K-Band total mag	NED
GMBCG J135.39754+20.87035 BCG		851,400	~	BrClG	2MASS K-band total mag	NED
ESO 349-15 (ESO 349-G 015)		850,600	102,100	Sc?	90% total B-light	NED
APMUKS(BJ) B044947.74-190134.6		848,500	848,500	~	2MASS K-band total mag	NED
2MASX J16064384+2329162		848,000	~	BrClG	2MASS K-Band total mag	NED
OGC 193		844,600	~	BrCIG	2MASS K-band total mag	NED
2MASX J20511108+0056456		843,600	~	BrClG	2MASS K-band total mag	NED
LEDA 1239494		842,600	~	~	2MASS K-band total mag	NED
Abell 963 BCG		841,200	605,700	BrClG	2MASS K-band total mag	NED
ESO 541-13 (ESO 541-G 013)		840,700	655,700	cD; E3 pec	90% total B-light	NED
4C 18.68		838,100	~	Sy1	2MASS K-band total mag	NED
WHL J082728.3+081742 BCG		838,200	838,200	BrClG	r SDSS Isophotal	NED
OGC 605		835,400	~	BrClG	2MASS K-band total mag	NED
OGC 378		833,100	~	BrClG	2MASS K-band total mag	NED
OGC 560		830,900	598,200	BrClG	2MASS K-band total mag	NED
MACS J0024.5+3312 BCG		830,600	548,200	~	2MASS K-band total mag	NED
2MASX J14582288+3613501		829,100	~	BrClG	2MASS K-band total mag	NED
2MASX J09503021+5735027		828,400	~	~	2MASS K-band total mag	NED
OGC 369		827,300	413,700	BrClG	2MASS K-band total mag	NED
Abell 1602 BCG		822,000	575,400	BrClG	2MASS K-band total mag	NED
B3 1448+445		813,900	634,800	BrClG	2MASS K-band total mag	NED
APMUKS(BJ) B035543.68-480524.6		811,500	811,500	~	2MASS K-band total mag	NED
2MASX J08154445+4506521		811,300	~	BrClG	2MASS K-band total mag	NED
2MASX J02072650+2253472		807,400	~	~	2MASS K-band total mag	NED
2MASX J11223608+2235295		806,900	~	BrClG	2MASS K-band total mag	NED
LEDA 1662572		806,900	~	~	2MASS K-band total mag	NED
NGC 623		803,900	611,000	cD; E	27.0 B-mag arcsec^{−2}	NED
PGC 6616		803,800	401,900	E (Note: Despite being classified as E, images show a spiral galaxy.)	27.0 B-mag arcsec^{−2}	NED
Abell 1413 BCG		801,400	256,400	cD; E; BrClG	25.0 r-mag arcsec^{−2}	NED
LEDA 1143180		800,300	512,200	~	2MASS K-band total mag	NED
Abell 773N BCG		798,000	590,500	BrClG; cD	2MASS K-band total mag	NED
ESO 291-9 (ESO 291-G 009)		795,100	461,200	cD4; SA0^{−};BrClG	90% total B-light	NED
LEDA 1678798		794,000	~	BrClG	2MASS K-band total mag	NED
Abell 1504 BCG		790,200	458,300	BrClG	2MASS K-band total mag	NED
LCSB S1161P		788,800	284,000	BrClG	2MASS K-band total mag	NED
OGC 31		785,800	345,800	~	2MASS K-band total mag	NED
OGC 763		784,500	564,800	~	2MASS K-band total mag	NED
ESO 237-3 (ESO 237-G 003)		783,000	70,480	Sc	90% total B-light	NED
LEDA 1816387		782,500	336,500	~	2MASS K-band total mag	NED
LEDA 1118210		782,400	594,600	BrClG	2MASS K-band total mag	NED
NVSS J080730+340042		780,900	359,200	BrClG	2MASS K-band total mag	NED
LEDA 2066332		779,700	467,800	~	2MASS K-band total mag	NED
OGC 1311		776,900	419,500	BrClG	2MASS K-band total mag	NED
2MASX J14114669+5413039		776,200	776,200	BrClG	2MASS K-band total mag	NED
Abell 812 BCG		772,900	541,000	BrClG	2MASS K-band total mag	NED
OGC 856		772,200	509,700	BrClG	2MASS K-band total mag	NED
7C 1043+5953		771,000	400,900	BrClG	2MASS K-band total mag	NED
Abell 1785B BCG		769,800	508,100	BrClG	2MASS K-band total mag	NED
LEDA 2463193		769,500	769,500	BrClG	2MASS K-band total mag	NED
NGC 5084		769,500	115,400	S0	90% total B-light	NED
Abell 781 b		766,500	337,300	BrClG	25.0 r-mag arcsec^{−2}	NED
B2 1132+32		763,600	381,800	BrClG	2MASS K-band total mag	NED
OGC 231		762,000	487,700	BrClG	2MASS K-band total mag	NED
OGC 26		760,700	699,900	BrClG	2MASS K-band total mag	NED
Abell 655 BCG		760,000	577,600	BrClG	2MASS K-band total mag	NED
OGC 499		757,800	515,300	~	2MASS K-band total mag	NED
LEDA 1460988		755,500	438,200	BrClG	2MASS K-band total mag	NED
2MASX J01331683+2311233		751,700	278,100	~	2MASS K-band total mag	NED
Abell 908 BCG		750,200	555,100	BrClG	2MASS K-band total mag	NED
2MASX J00193870+0335573		748,100	433,900	~	2MASS K-band total mag	NED
Abell 2061 b		747,700	583,200	BrClG	2MASS K-band total mag	NED
2MASX J14475695+1445330		745,200	~	BrClG	2MASS K-band total mag	NED
2MASX J14562781+0438121		744,100	~	BrClG	2MASS K-band total mag	NED
OGC 188		742,900	534,900	BrClG	2MASS K-band total mag	NED
ESO 198-1 (ESO 198-G 001)		741,600	563,600	cD4; E4	27.0 B-mag arcsec^{−2}	NED
GMBCG J198.26268+35.32836 BCG		741,200	~	BrClG	2MASS K-band total mag	NED
3C 295		738,000	738,000	E/S0;LEG;BrClG NLRG	2MASS K-band total mag	NED
OGC 199		737,500	457,200	BrClG	2MASS K-band total mag	NED
Abell 267 BCG		736,700	302,000	BrClG	25.0 r-mag arcsec^{−2}	NED
2MASX J10360840+2614194		734,300	~	BrClG	2MASS K-band total mag	NED
ACT-CL J0235-5121 BCG		731,600	731,600	~	2MASS K-band total mag	NED
Abell 1758N BCG		731,500	321,900	BrClG	2MASS K-band total mag	NED
SPT-CL J2138-6007 BCG		730,000	730,000	~	2MASS K-band total mag	NED
Abell 360 BCG		727,700	363,900	cD	2MASS K-band total mag	NED
ESO 251-21 (ESO 251-G 021)		727,700	458,400	SAB0^{−} pec; E/S0	90% total B-light	NED
2MASX J14371203+2044542		724,600	724,600	BrClG	2MASS K-band total mag	NED
2MASX J09573699+0234255		724,400	724,400	BrClG	2MASS K-band total mag	NED
OGC 667		722,900	375,900	BrClG	2MASS K-band total mag	NED
LEDA 2188433		721,600	721,600	BrClG	2MASS K-band total mag	NED
OGC 235		720,200	576,200	BrClG	2MASS K-band total mag	NED
Abell 1807 BCG		720,200	475,300	cD	2MASS K-band total mag	NED
OGC 898		719,900	417,500	~	2MASS K-band total mag	NED
OGC 505		717,300	~	BrClG	2MASS K-band total mag	NED
NGC 6872		717,000	143,400	SAB(rs)c	25.5 r-mag arcsec^{−2}	NED
Abell S1077 BCG		716,900	372,800	~	2MASS K-band total mag	NED
Abell 2125 BCG		715,200	515,200	E (Note: Starburst galaxy)	2MASS K-band total mag	NED
B3 1715+425		715,200	472,000	BrClG; AGN (Note: A blazar.)	2MASS K-band total mag	NED
2MASX J09155189+2504407		714,000	~	BrClG	2MASS K-band total mag	NED
Abell 2219 BCG		713,400	385,300	BrClG	2MASS K-band total mag	NED
OGC 966		710,000	284,000	BrClG	2MASS K-band total mag	NED
ESO 552-20 (ESO 552-G 020)		710,000	411,800	cD; E	90% total B-light	NED
OGC 512		709,700	340,700	BrClG	2MASS K-band total mag	NED
LEDA 2304600		708,700	~	cD	2MASS K-band total mag	NED
ESO 11-4 (ESO 011-G 004)		707,400	488,100	cD4; E4 pec	90% total B-light	NED
2MASX J10330846+0902144		706,800	~	BrClG	2MASS K-band total mag	NED
IC 1633		705,700	543,400	cD; E1	27.0 B-mag arcsec^{−2}	NED
ESO 443-4 (ESO 443-G 004)		705,200	423,100	cD; S0; BrClG	90% total B-light	NED
2dFGRS S306Z150		704,300	704,300	~	2MASS K-band total mag	NED
LEDA 2262657		704,000	521,000	BrClG	2MASS K-band total mag	NED
LEDA 1869052		703,100	464,000	BrClG	2MASS K-band total mag	NED
NGC 1759		702,800	632,500	cD; E	27.0 B-mag arcsec^{−2}	NED
LEDA 1869814		702,100	463,300	BrClG	2MASS K-band total mag	NED
2MFGC 12274		700,900	140,200	~	25.0 B-mag arcsec^{−2}	NED
Abell S235 BCG		700,900	252,300	cD	2MASS K-band total mag	NED

Listed below are some notable galaxies under 700,000 light-years in diameter, for the purpose of comparison. All links to NED are available, except for the Milky Way, which is linked to the relevant paper detailing its size.

Notable galaxies with diameters 700,000 light-years or less
Galaxy name/designation	Image	Major axis diameter (in light-years)	Minor axis diameter (in light years)	Morphology	Estimation method	Link for object
ESO 444-46 (ESO 444-G 046)		670,700	382,300	cD4; E4; BrClG	27.0 B-mag arcsec^{−2}	NED
NGC 4038 (Note: The larger galaxy in the Antennae Galaxies pair.)		634,400	456,800	SB(s)m pec	27.0 B-mag arcsec^{−2}	NED
Tadpole Galaxy		558,400	111,700	SB(s)c pec	25.0 B-mag arcsec^{−2}	NED
Abell 2261 BCG		544,600	533,800	cD; E	2MASS K-band total mag	NED
Hercules A		459,800	285,100	E; WLRG; NLRG	2MASS K-band total mag	NED
UGC 2885 ("Rubin's Galaxy")		438,100	201,500	SA(rs)c	25.0 B-mag arcsec^{−2}	NED
NGC 1399		412,300	379,300	cD; E1 pec	90% total B-light	NED
NeVe 1		332,100	239,100	cD; E	2MASS K-band total mag	NED
Alcyoneus		242,900 (Note: Major axis refers to the visible stellar axis of the host galaxy. Radio lobes are 15 million light-years across, though not considered a part of the main galaxy.)	155,400	E	25.0 r-mag arcsec^{−2}	NED
Andromeda Galaxy		152,300	152,300	SA(s)b	25.0 mag/arcsec^{2}	NED
Centaurus A		123,100	94,750	S0pec; Sy2; BL Lac	90% total B-light	NED
Messier 87		118,800 (Note: This is the diameter as measured through the 25.0 mag/arcsec^{−2} isophote at the B-band. The diffuse stellar halo of this galaxy extends up to 300 kiloparsecs (980,000 light-years) across.)	93,870	cD; E0–E1 pec; NLRG; Sy	25.0 B-mag arcsec^{−2}	NED
Malin 1		118,700 (Note: This is the diameter measured through the quoted estimation method. This galaxy has an immense, diffuse low-surface brightness spiral extending up to 200 kiloparsecs (650,000 light-years) across.)	118,700	S; LSB	2MASS K-band total mag	NED
NGC 262		101,100	78,860	SA(s)0/a; Sy2	2MASS K-band total mag	NED
Messier 81 ("Bode's Galaxy")		96,000	~ (Note: No stated minor axis)	SA(s)ab; LINER	2MASS K-band total mag	NED
Milky Way		87,400 ± 3,600	87,400 ± 3,600	Sb; Sbc; SB(rs)bc	25.0 B-mag arcsec^{−2}	
Messier 82 ("Cigar Galaxy")		47,300	21,800	I0; Sburst	2MASS K-band total mag	NED
Large Magellanic Cloud		32,500	~ (Note: No stated minor axis)	SB(s)m	25.0 B-mag arcsec^{−2}	NED

== See also ==
- List of largest stars
- List of most massive stars
- List of most massive black holes
- List of largest cosmic structures
- List of largest nebulae
- List of smallest galaxies
