= PGC 1470080 =

Galaxy in the constellation Boötes

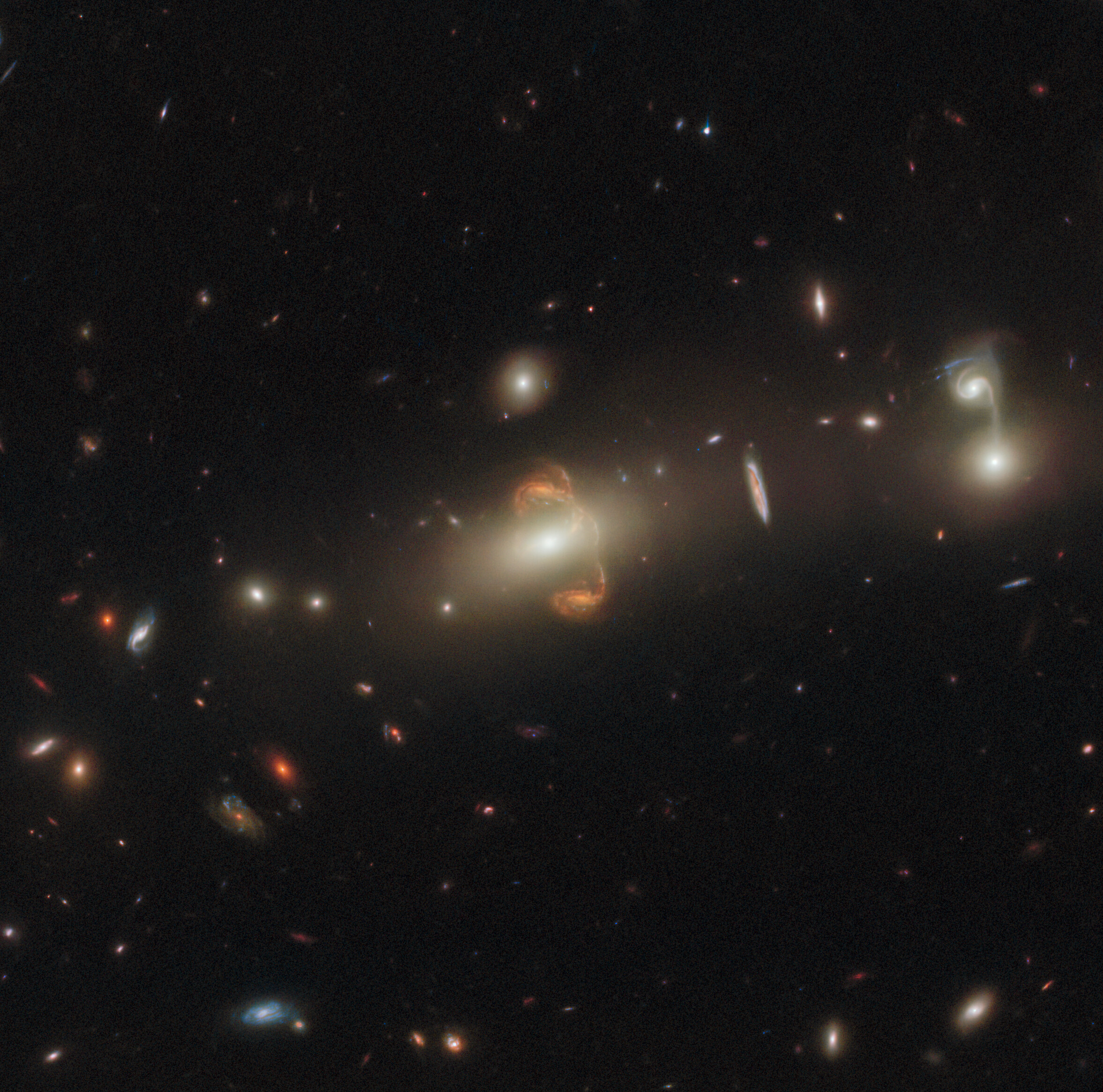
- Hubble Space Telescope image of PGC 1470080

Observation data (J2000.0 epoch)
- Constellation: Boötes
- Right ascension: 14h 38m 45.035s
- Declination: +14d 54m 12.56s
- Redshift: 0.237274
- Heliocentric radial velocity: 71,133 km/s
- Distance: 3.010 Gly (922.87 Mpc)
- Surface brightness: 17.5 mag

Characteristics
- Type: BrCLG
- Size: 571,000 ly

Other designations
- LEDA 1470080, 2MASX J14384504+1454128, SDSSCGB 05343.01, WHL J143845.0+145412 BCG, 2MASS J14384502+1454125, SDSS J143845.03+145412.5

PGC 1470080 is a type E elliptical galaxy located in the constellation Boötes. It is located 3 billion light-years away from the Solar System and has a diameter of 571,000 light-years, making it a type-cD galaxy and one of the largest.

== Characteristics ==
It is the brightest cluster galaxy of the galaxy cluster, WHL J143845.0+145412. The galaxy acts as a gravitational lens for the much more distant spiral galaxy SGAS J143845+145407. This creates a mirror image of the galaxy, thus creating a detailed display of the astronomical spectacle.

This phenomenon occurs when a massive celestial body, such as a galaxy cluster, creates sufficient curvature of spacetime for the path of light to be bent by the lens. This creates multiple images of the original galaxy where the background object appears as a distorted arc or ring.

This observation takes advantage of gravitational lensing to peer through early universe galaxies. It helps to reveal details of distant galaxies, allowing astronomers to determine star formation in such early galaxies while giving scientists a better insight on how the evolution of galaxies have unfolded. Gravitational lensing is a tool able to contribute significant new results in areas as different as the cosmological distance scale, dark matter in halos and galaxy structures.

According to the Hubble image of PGC 1470080, it is shown to be a peculiar lenticular galaxy rather than an elliptical galaxy as expected.
