= NGC 6008 =

Galaxy in the constellation Serpens

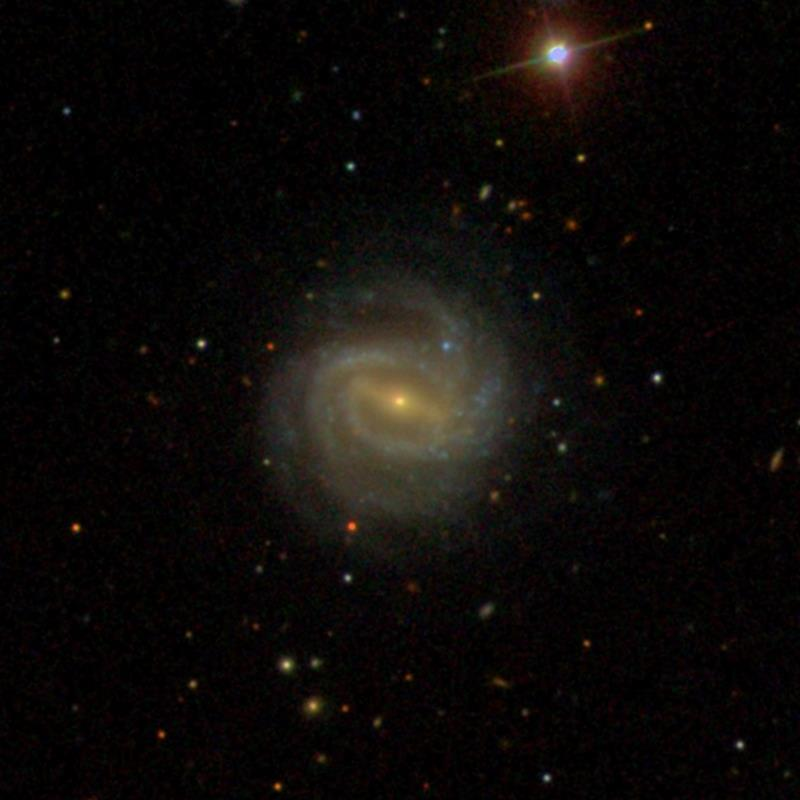
- NGC 6008 imaged by SDSS

Observation data (J2000 epoch)
- Constellation: Serpens
- Right ascension: 15^{h} 52^{m} 56.0543^{s}
- Declination: +21° 06′ 01.819″
- Redshift: 0.016209
- Heliocentric radial velocity: 4859 ± 3 km/s
- Distance: 238.6 ± 16.7 Mly (73.15 ± 5.12 Mpc)
- Group or cluster: NGC 6052 group (LGG 403)
- Apparent magnitude (V): 12.9

Characteristics
- Type: SB(r)b
- Size: ~168,700 ly (51.72 kpc) (estimated)
- Apparent size (V): 1.4′ × 1.3′

Other designations
- IRAS 15507+2114, 2MASX J15525603+2106017, NGC 6008A, UGC 10076, MCG +04-37-052, PGC 56289, CGCG 136-110

NGC 6008 (sometimes referred to as NGC 6008A) is a barred spiral galaxy in the constellation of Serpens. Its velocity with respect to the cosmic microwave background is 4,959 ± 8 km/s, which corresponds to a Hubble distance of 73.2 ± 5.1 Mpc (~239 million light-years). It was discovered by French astronomer Édouard Stephan on 10 June 1880.

NGC 6008 is a LINER galaxy, i.e. a galaxy whose nucleus has an emission spectrum characterized by broad lines of weakly ionized atoms.

== NGC 6052 Group ==
According to A.M. Garcia, NGC 6008 is part of the NGC 6052 group (also known as LGG 403). This group has at least 13 members: NGC 5975, NGC 6020, NGC 6030, NGC 6032, NGC 6052, NGC 6060, NGC 6073, IC 1132, CGCG 137-037, UGC 10127, UGC 10197, and UGC 10211.

== Supernova ==
One supernova has been observed in NGC 6008:

- SN 2023apm (Type II-P, mag. 19.45) was discovered by the Zwicky Transient Facility on 23 January 2023.

== See also ==
- List of NGC objects (6001–7000)
