= ESO 291-9 =

Galaxy in the constellation Grus

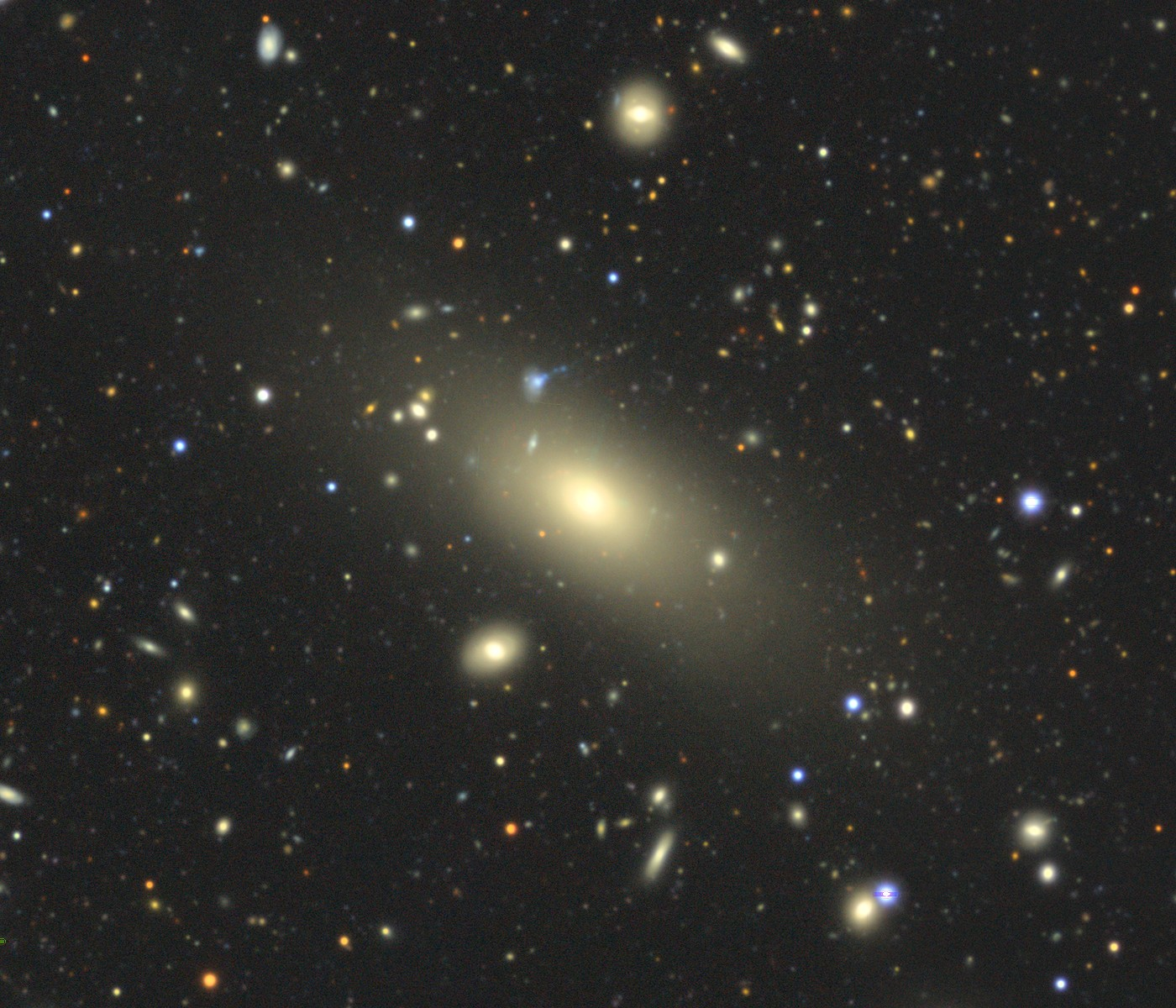
- ESO 291-9 imaged by Legacy Surveys

Observation data (J2000 epoch)
- Constellation: Grus
- Right ascension: 23^{h} 13^{m} 58.6603^{s}
- Declination: −42° 43′ 39.087″
- Redshift: 0.056396±0.0000670
- Heliocentric radial velocity: 16,907±20 km/s
- Distance: 801.8 ± 56.1 Mly (245.83 ± 17.21 Mpc)
- Group or cluster: Sersic 159−03
- Apparent magnitude (V): 14.64

Characteristics
- Type: cD4
- Size: ~794,400 ly (243.57 kpc) (estimated)
- Apparent size (V): 1.3′ × 0.8′

Other designations
- 2MASX J23135863-4243393, MCG -07-47-023, PGC 70747

ESO 291-9 is a supergiant Type-cD galaxy located in the southern constellation of Grus. The redshift of the galaxy is (z) 0.056 and it was first discovered as an active galactic nucleus candidate by astronomers in March 1987. It is classified as a lenticular galaxy with an S0 morphology and is the brightest cluster galaxy of Sersic 159−03, also known as Abell S1101, an X-ray luminous and rich galaxy cluster. It is also one of the largest galaxies known, with a diameter of around 243 kiloparsecs.

== Description ==
ESO 291-9 is a lenticular type-cD galaxy dominating the center of the Sersic 159−03 galaxy cluster. When observed, it is found to display signs of strong iron concentrations that is within its position. There is an extended iron-rich structure that is around 30 arcseconds from the core in the east to west direction, hinting the iron elements are spread out inconsistently. This might be explained by a recent galaxy merger that occurred in the northeastern part of the BCG.

The host galaxy of ESO 291-9 has been described to have its own major axis aligned towards northeast to southwest direction. Imaging made with Hubble Space Telescope (HST) found it has a dust lane that is found extending from the center of the galaxy to the north, coinciding with displaced hydrogen-alpha emitting gas towards the east direction. There is also another dust lane located south from the core, described to have a faint appearance. The core of the galaxy has been described to have a flatter surface brightness profile compared to its own de Vaucouleurs profile. There is also a curved filament feature that elongates north of its nucleus with an approximate radius of 35 kiloparsecs, with further detections of fainter ultraviolet emission. The star formation rate of the galaxy has been calculated as 1 solar mass (M_{☉}) per year.

The nucleus of the galaxy is found active and it has been classified as a radio galaxy. When observed, the source is described to contain radio emission shown as concentrated in the center, with faint irregular radio lobes of asymmetric lengths. The power-law spectrum of the source has been categorized as steep and there are hints of further radio emission located northeast, northwest and also east from the core position. There are presence of radio jets that originates in the northeast to southeast direction, before bending in clockwise direction. A radio core is found to be well detected and it has an extension in the east by around 12 arcseconds. There are also detections of molecular gas in the galaxy that extends in both directions from the nucleus region. The nuclear region of the gas is found to contain both blueshift and redshifted gas components by ± 120 kilometers per seconds. Evidence also showed the jets from the galaxy are strongly interacting with the surrounding hot gas from the cluster. There is a presence of a further filament feature associated with the X-ray cavities of the galaxy with the total molecular mass being around 1.0×10^{9} M_{☉}.
