= Abell 1758N BCG =

Brightest cluster galaxy of the northern cluster of Abell 1758 in Canes Venatici

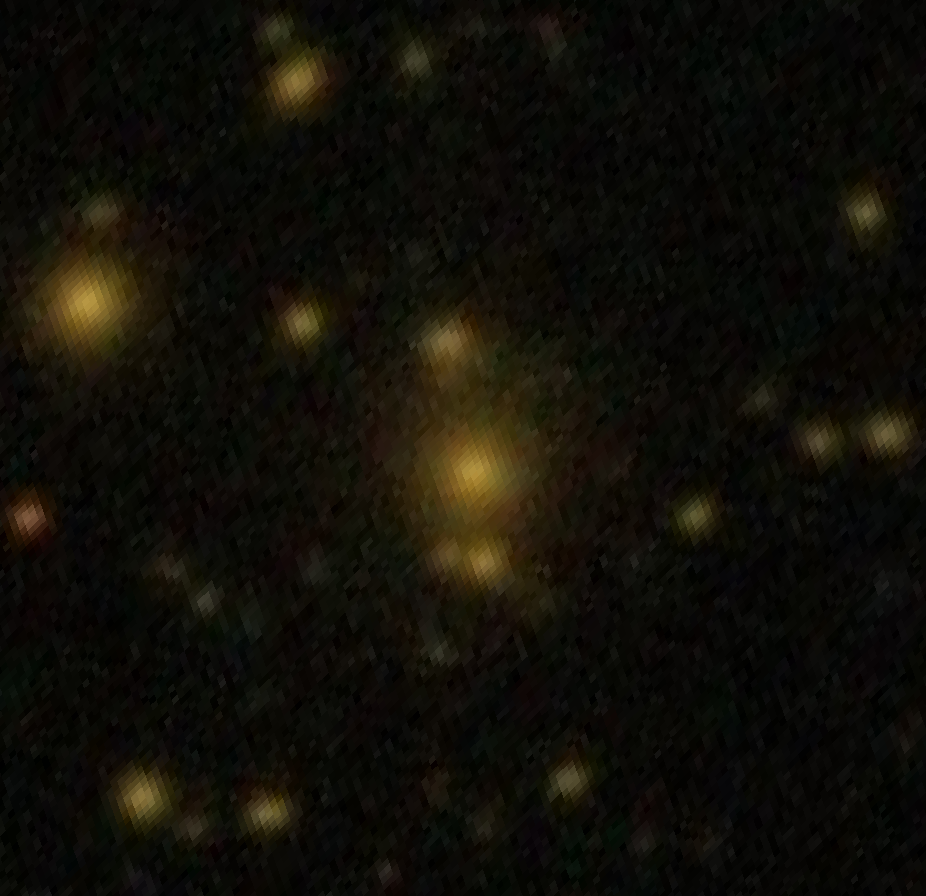
- SDSS image of Abell 1758N BCG

Observation data (J2000.0 epoch)
- Constellation: Canes Venatici
- Right ascension: 13^{h} 32^{m} 38.41^{s}
- Declination: +50° 33′ 35.45″
- Redshift: 0.278577
- Heliocentric radial velocity: 83,515 ± 14 km/s
- Distance: 4,022.3 ± 281.6 Mly (1,233.23 ± 86.33 Mpc)
- Group or cluster: Abell 1758 (Northern Cluster)
- magnitude (J): 14.70

Characteristics
- Type: BrClG
- Size: ~731,000 ly (224.1 kpc) (estimated)

Other designations
- 2MASX J13323845+5033351, Abell 1758b:[BHB2008] BCG, Abell 1758:[HSH2009] BCG, ILT J133238.4+503335.5, ABELL 1758N:[REE2012] BCG, ABELL 1758NW:[MCM2017] BCG, WHL J133238.4+503335 BCG, SDSS J133238.41+503335.9 LEDA 3809655

Abell 1758N BCG (short for Abell 1758 Northern Brightest Cluster Galaxy) is a massive elliptical galaxy located in the constellation of Canes Venatici. The redshift of the galaxy is (z) 0.278 and it is the brightest cluster galaxy of the northern subcluster region of the galaxy cluster Abell 1758, which in turn also resides in the northwestern region.

== Description ==
Abell 1758N BCG is classified as a radio galaxy, with a radio source having a total estimated radio power of 14.6 ± 0.4 × 10^{23} W Hz^{−1} and has a radio flux density of 6.03 ± 0.15 mJy at 1.4 GHz. There is also radio emission in the form of a radio halo.

The total magnitude of the BCG calculated by the Sloan Digital Sky Survey (SDSS) is 17.15, while the heliocentric radial velocity is 83,489 kilometers per second. The optical spectrum of the BCG does not show emission lines.

The total star formation at 24 micrometers is 0.93 M_{☉} per year, while the stellar mass of the BCG is 0.486 × 10^{12} M_{☉}. The core of the BCG has a red color appearance based on the inner shape color profile, with the BCG itself having a best fit surface brightness profile parameter of 51.53^{+0.33}_{−0.42} kiloparsecs.

The BCG is also an X-ray source with a rest-frame X-ray luminosity of 1.3 ± 0.4 erg s^{−1}. The X-ray peak of the northwestern subclump coincides with the position of the BCG.
