= ESO 306-17 =

Galaxy in the constellation Columba

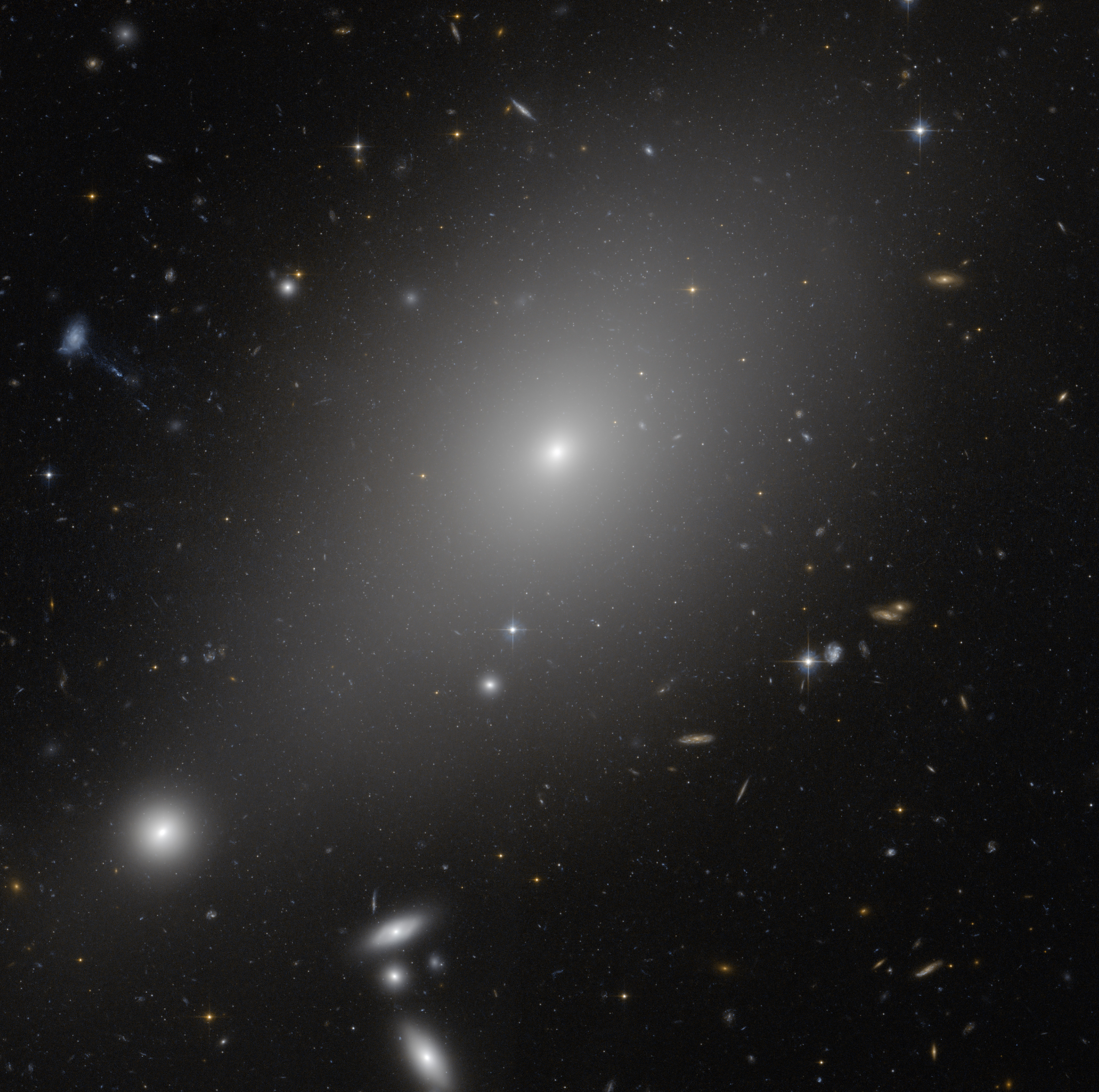
- Image of ESO 306-17 by the Hubble Space Telescope; Release date: 4 March 2010

Observation data (J2000.0 epoch)
- Constellation: Columba
- Right ascension: 05^{h} 40^{m} 06.73^{s}
- Declination: −40° 50′ 10.6″
- Redshift: 0.035805±0.000083
- Heliocentric radial velocity: 10,734±25 km/s
- Galactocentric velocity: 10,544±26 km/s
- Distance: 517.3 ± 36.20 Mly (158.6 ± 11.1 Mpc)h^{−1}_{0.6774} (Comoving); 506 Mly (155.1 Mpc)h^{−1}_{0.6774} (Light-travel)
- Apparent magnitude (B): 13.36

Characteristics
- Type: E+3
- Size: 1,070,000 ly × 706,100 ly (328.04 kpc × 216.50 kpc) (diameter; 90% total B-band light) (Note: The quoted diameter in this infobox was based on NED's provided scale "Virgo + GA + Shapley" of 769 pc/arcsec multiplied with given angular diameters.); 399,300 ly × 287,500 ly (122.42 kpc × 88.15 kpc) (diameter; "total" magnitude)
- Apparent size (V): 2.5′ × 1.5′ (V-band)

Other designations
- MCG -07-12-009, PGC 17570

ESO 306-17 is a fossil group giant elliptical galaxy in the constellation Columba, about 1.07 million light-years in diameter, and roughly 517 million light-years away.

The galaxy is situated alone in a volume of space about it. It is theorized that the galaxy cannibalized its nearest companions, hence, being a fossil group. The galaxy is a giant elliptical of type cD3 (E+3), one of the largest types of galaxies.

== See also ==
- Abell 267 BCG – another fossil galaxy group supergiant elliptical galaxy
