= 4C 18.68 =

Seyfert 1 galaxy in the constellation Pegasus

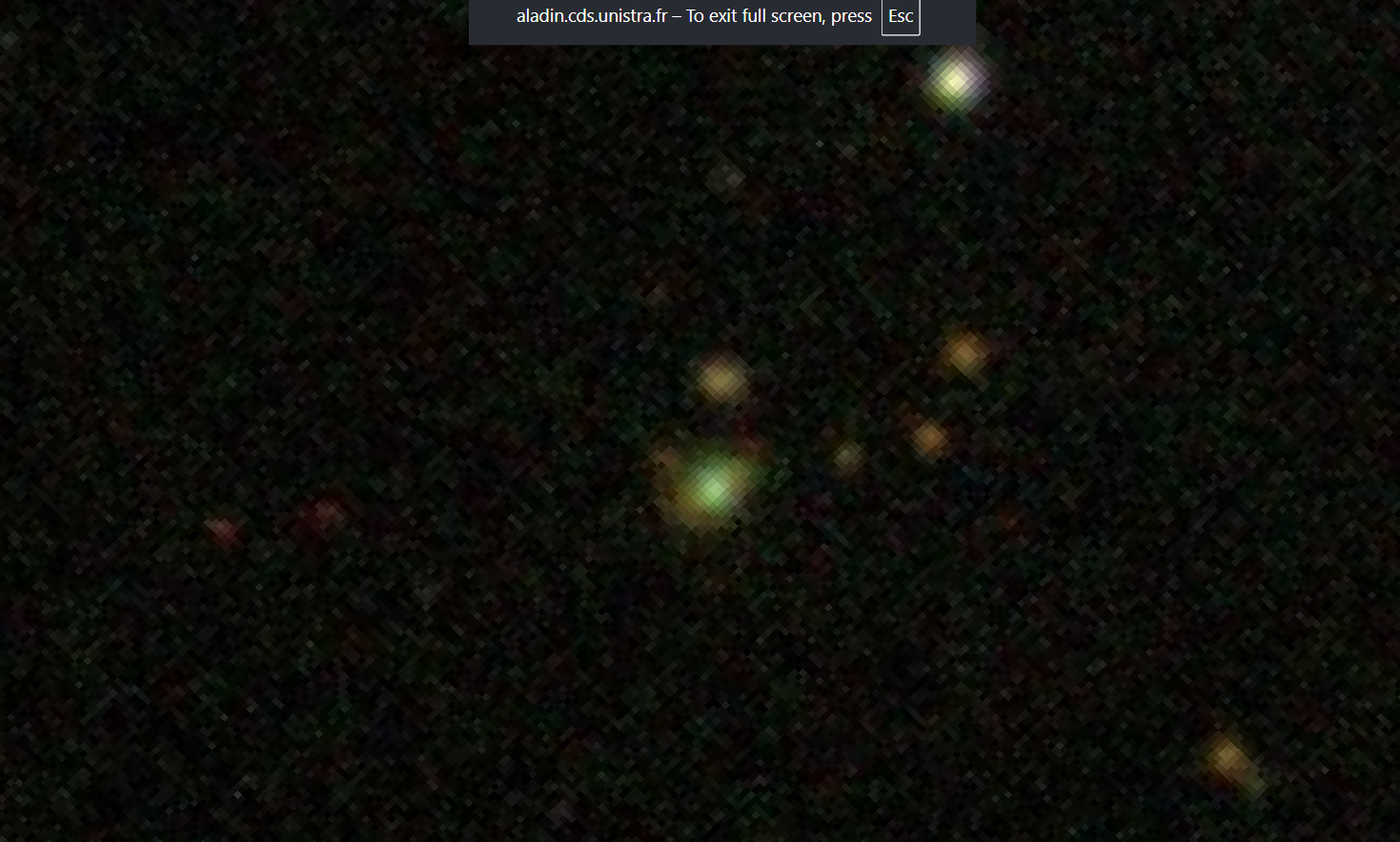
- SDSS image of 4C 18.68

Observation data (J2000.0 epoch)
- Constellation: Pegasus
- Right ascension: 23^{h} 07^{m} 45.62^{s}
- Declination: +19° 01′ 20.50″
- Redshift: 0.313000
- Heliocentric radial velocity: 93,835 km/s
- Distance: 3.639 Gly
- Apparent magnitude (V): 17.50
- Apparent magnitude (B): 17.63

Characteristics
- Type: Sy1
- Size: ~838,000 ly (257.0 kpc) (estimated)

Other designations
- PKS 2305+188, 2MASX J23074560+1901207, LEDA 2819542, SDSS J2307445.62+190120.4, OZ +108, NRAO 0703, TXS 2305+187

4C 18.68 is a low-redshift quasar located in the constellation of Pegasus. The redshift of the object is (z) 0.313 and it was first discovered as a radio source in 1967 by astronomers. With a diameter of 257 kiloparsecs across, it is considered one of the largest and most massive galaxies known.

== Description ==
4C 18.68 is a radio-selected quasar. Its host is classified as an elliptical galaxy, mainly due to it being smooth with no signs of a spiral structure. It is described as having an extended appearance based on narrowband imaging with a faint halo and a faint curved tidal tail originating from within its southeast side.

High resolution imaging showed the galaxy has irregularities, including its isotopes on the southeast end of its axis splitting into two branches rather than in a smooth ellipse pattern. This suggests the galaxy is currently undergoing a tidal interaction with its close western companion. Imaging by the Hubble Space Telescope, also showed there is a bright emission region of doubly ionized oxygen, lying away from its nucleus.

The radio source of 4C 18.68 is mainly compact, with a curved structure embedded within its 60 kiloparsec radio halo. Radio imaging made with the Very Large Array, has found the central source of the halo component has a flat radio spectrum, while other parts are shown having steeper spectra which increases away from the central source. There are signs of fractional polarization in the halo, being differently distributed with the greatest of polarization located within the outer edges. The radio source is also said to be relatively young, with an estimated age of 10^{7} years. A radio core is present in 4C 18.68 with flux of 70 mJy at six centimeters and a luminosity of 24.85 W Hz^{−1}.

The radio jet of 4C 18.68 is curved, with a moderate jet velocity of 0.7c and orientation at 20 degrees at half opening cone angle. Based on its structure and the velocity, it is shown as precessed, displaying ejections of material at relativistic speeds. The precession period of the jet is estimated to be 5 × 10^{4} years, which roughly equals to 50,000 years.
