= NGC 6052 =

Interacting galaxies in the constellation Hercules

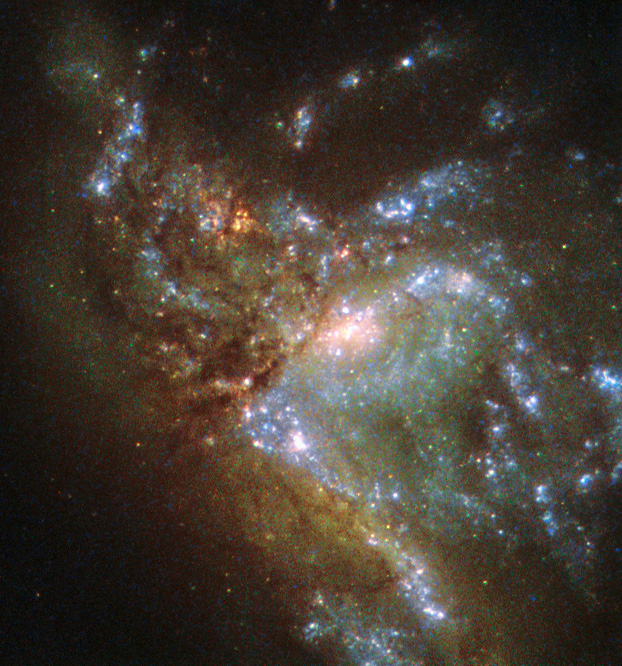
- NGC 6052 imaged by the Hubble Space Telescope

Observation data (J2000 epoch)
- Constellation: Hercules
- Right ascension: 16^{h} 05^{m} 12.880^{s}
- Declination: +20° 32′ 32.61″
- Redshift: 0.015808
- Heliocentric radial velocity: 4739 km/s
- Distance: 399.05 ± 110.83 Mly (122.350 ± 33.980 Mpc)
- Apparent magnitude (V): 13.00
- Apparent magnitude (B): 13.44

Characteristics
- Type: Sc
- Size: 110,900 ly (33,990 pc) (Note: RC3 D_{0} (blue) values used.)
- Apparent size (V): 0.9′ × 0.7′

Other designations
- NGC 6064, Arp 209, UGC 10182, MGC+04-38-022, Mrk 297, PGC 57039

NGC 6052 is a pair of galaxies in the constellation of Hercules. It was discovered on 11 June 1784 by William Herschel. It was described as "faint, pretty large, irregularly round" by John Louis Emil Dreyer, the compiler of the New General Catalogue.

The two components of NGC 6052 are designated NGC 6052A and NGC 6052B, respectively. The two, attracted by each other's gravity, have collided and are interacting with each other. NGC 6052 is currently in a late stage of merging, where the shape of the two galaxies is not distinctly defined.

SN 1982aa, a powerful radio supernova, was detected in NGC 6052.

== Gallery ==
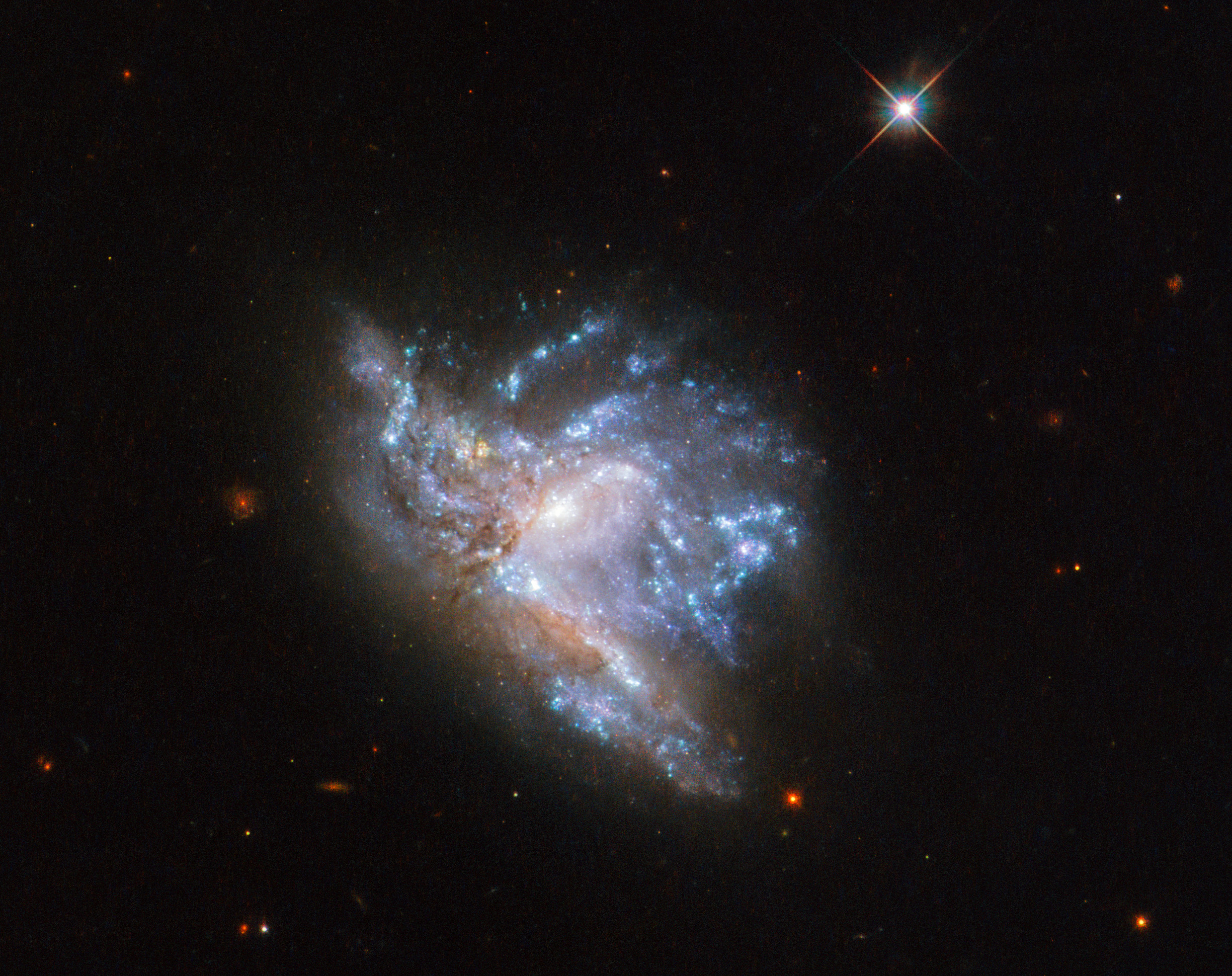
NGC 6052 observed by Hubble with its WFPC2 camera.

== See also ==
- Hercules (Chinese astronomy)
- List of largest galaxies
- List of nearest galaxies
- List of NGC objects (6001–7000)
