= Abell 267 BCG =

Type-cD galaxy in the constellation Cetus

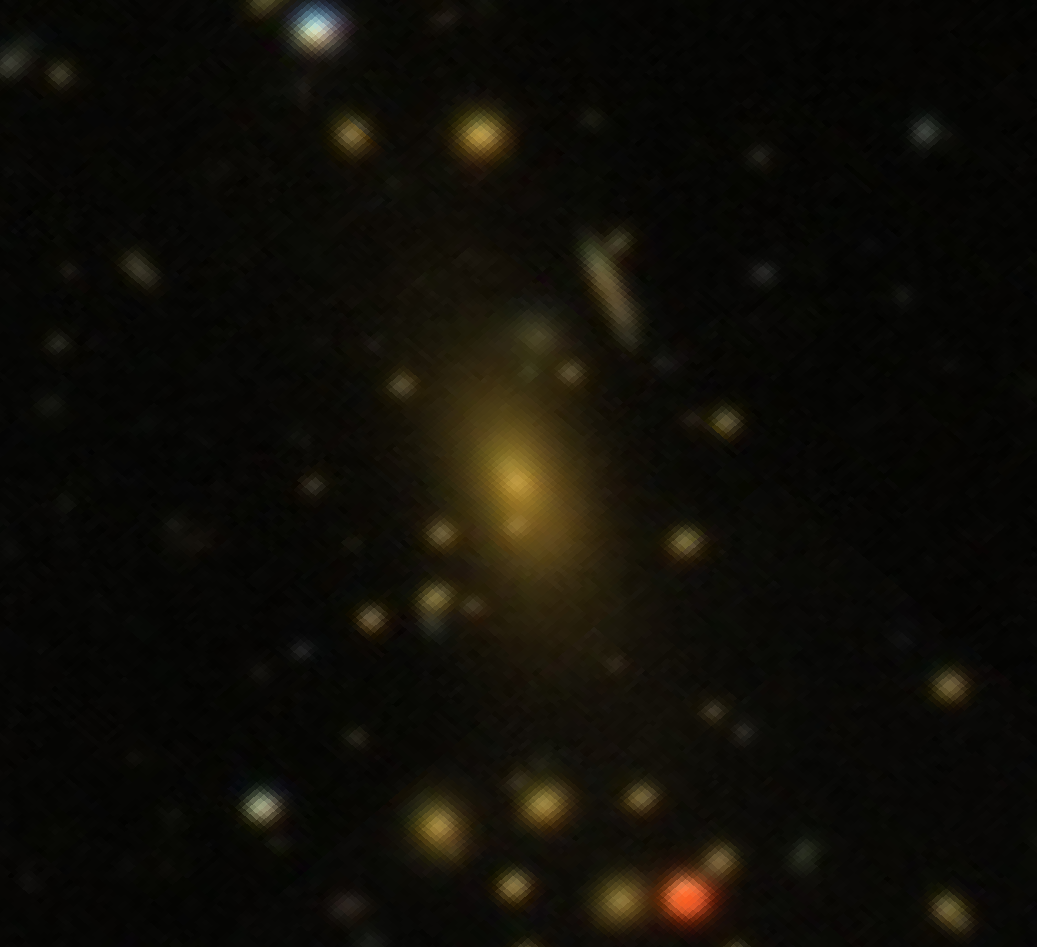
- SDSS image of Abell 267 BCG

Observation data (J2000.0 epoch)
- Constellation: Cetus
- Right ascension: 01^{h} 52^{m} 41.98^{s}
- Declination: +01° 00′ 25.83″
- Redshift: 0.229731
- Heliocentric radial velocity: 68,871 ± 12 km/s
- Distance: 3,315.3 ± 232.1 Mly (1,016.47 ± 71.15 Mpc)
- Group or cluster: Abell 267
- magnitude (J): 14.52
- magnitude (H): 13.60

Characteristics
- Type: BrCIG
- Size: ~736,000 ly (225.7 kpc) (estimated)

Other designations
- 2MASX J01524199+0100257, Abell 0267:[BHB2008] BCG, ASK 034321.0, LEDA 1181685, MaxBCG J028.17484+01.00710 BCG, RX J0152.7+0100:[BEV98] 001, SDSS J015241.95+010025.5

Abell 267 BCG (Short for Abell 267 Brightest Cluster Galaxy) is a massive type-cD galaxy residing as the brightest cluster galaxy in the fossil galaxy cluster, Abell 267. The redshift of the galaxy is (z) 0.229 and it was first discovered in January 1993 by astronomers.

== Description ==
Abell 267 BCG is a central dominant galaxy. When observed with the Very Large Array (VLA) at six centimeters, it is found to display no signs of any associated radio emission, making this BCG technically radio-quiet. The total radio power estimated is found to be less than 23.55 W Hz^{−1}. The BCG also displays the absence of emission lines in its own optical spectrum. No radio flux was detected based on optical follow-up studies.

The core of the BCG has a red appearance based on its inner color profile shape. The BCG's projected offset in respect to the X-ray emission peak of the cluster has been estimated as 77.5 kiloparsecs. A study published in 2012, found it belongs to a fossil galaxy cluster and has an R-band magnitude of 15.72. The effective surface brightness of the BCG is estimated to be 19.50 ± 0.12 magnitudes per arcsecond square. The supermassive black hole lying in the center of the BCG is estimated to have a mass of 2.11 × 10^{9} M_{☉}. The rotation of the BCG is estimated to be 0.05 ± 0.06 V_{max} with a central velocity dispersion of 321 ± 8 kilometers per seconds.

Evidence suggests the BCG has an unresolved radio source based on VLA observations at 1.4 GHz frequencies. with the total radio luminosity calculated as less than 21.3 × 1038 keV s^{−1} Hz^{−1}. The radio core imaged at 10 GHz, is estimated to have an upper limit of less than 0.18 mJy with a flat normalization of 0.29. A study published in 2016, found the BCG has an intermediate stellar population of stars that are mainly aged 4,070 ± 130 and 4,010 ± 200 million years respectively. A total stellar mass of 12.42^{+0.01}_{−0.02} M_{☉} has been calculated for the BCG with a stellar velocity dispersion of 297 ± 16 kilometers per seconds. The total ultraviolet star formation rate is estimated to be 2.86 M_{☉} per year.

== See also ==
- ESO 306-17 – another fossil galaxy group supergiant elliptical galaxy
