= ZwCl 8193 BCG =

Brightest cluster galaxy of ZwCl 8193 in the constellation Hercules

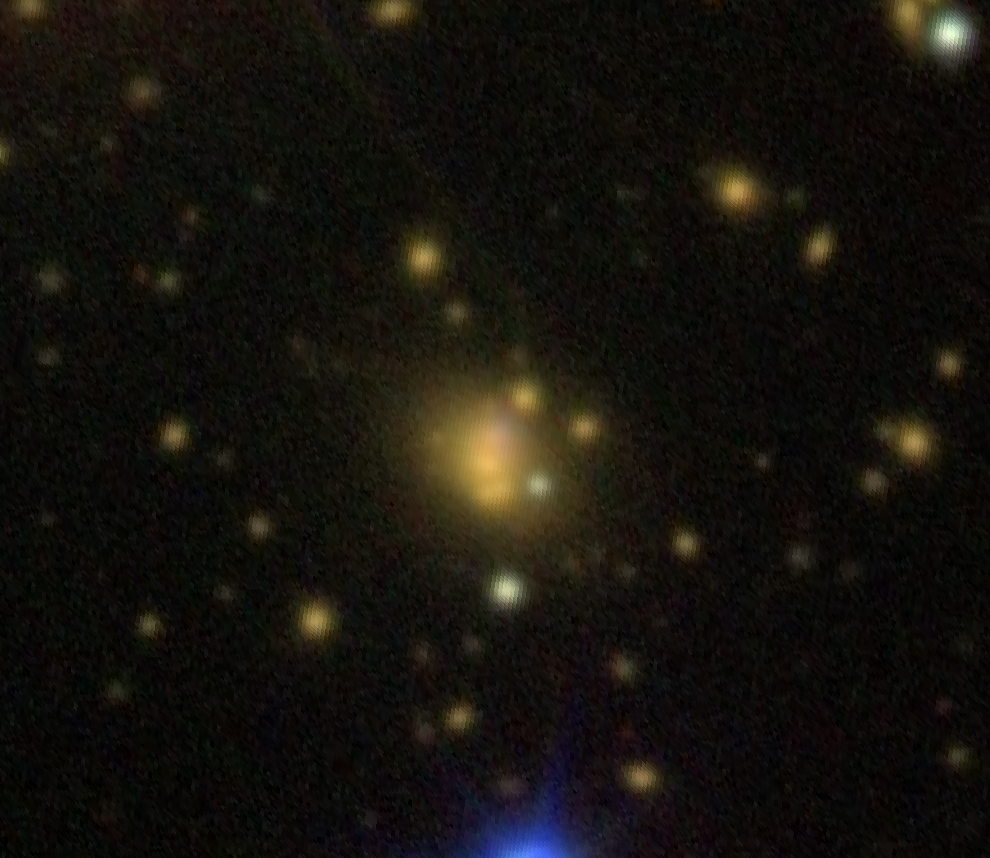
- SDSS image of ZwCl 8193 BCG

Observation data (J2000.0 epoch)
- Constellation: Hercules
- Right ascension: 17^{h} 17^{m} 19.20^{s}
- Declination: +42° 26′ 59.84″
- Redshift: 0.182900
- Heliocentric radial velocity: 54,832 ± 30 km/s
- Distance: 2,648.4 ± 185.4 Mly (812.00 ± 56.84 Mpc)
- Group or cluster: ZwCl 8193
- magnitude (J): 13.24

Characteristics
- Type: BrClG;AGN blazar
- Size: ~714,500 ly (219.08 kpc) (estimated)

Other designations
- 2MASX J17171926+4226571, NVSS J171719+422659, LEDA 93954, OCARS 1715+425, OGC 0022, RX J1717.2+4226, WHL J171719.2+422657 BCG

ZwCl 8193 BCG (Short for ZwCl 8193 Brightest Cluster Galaxy) is a massive elliptical galaxy residing as the brightest cluster galaxy of the galaxy cluster, ZwCl 8193. The redshift of the galaxy is (z) 0.182 and it was first discovered by astronomers in July 1999, who found the galaxy displays emission lines in its optical spectrum.

== Description ==
ZwCl 8193 BCG is categorized as an elliptical galaxy inside a rich galaxy environment. The galaxy has a disturbed appearance. indicating it is undergoing multiple ongoing galaxy mergers. There is also evidence that there is in the outskirts of the BCG a tidally disrupted galaxy, based on the presence of clumpy bright far-ultraviolet and hydrogen alpha emission that is arranged in a spiral formation. A nuclear bulge is present in the BCG according to optical and 3 ɥm imaging. The total infrared star formation rate is estimated to be 59 M_{☉} per year. There is a possible double nucleus.

The BCG contains an active galactic nucleus (AGN), with an estimated radio power of 25.29 W Hz^{−1}. There is a radio source called B3 1715+425 that was originally associated with the BCG, but later reclassified as a tidally stripped radio galaxy or a nearly naked black hole located 8.5 kiloparsecs away from the BCG's central nucleus. The interaction with the BCG likely caused immense tidal forces to a point where the galaxy's outer portion was eventually pulled away, leaving only a small portion of it. The radio luminosity for the BCG itself is 41.61 ± 0.005 erg s^{−1} at 5 GHz frequencies.

A study published in 2002, reported detections of molecular hydrogen in the BCG. The total molecular mass is estimated to be less than 4.3 × 10^{10} M_{☉} and the molecular line luminosity is approximately 1.1 ± 0.1 × 10^{41} erg s^{−1}. A carbon oxide line survey also found cold molecular gas in the BCG based on presence of line detections, with the line positions being -14 ± 20 kilometers per seconds and has line widths of 242 ± 65 kilometers per second. The dust mass has been calculated as 3.8 × 10^{7} M_{☉}. One of the hydrogen-alpha emission blobs is centered on the BCG. A central supermassive black hole mass of 10.04 ± 0.05 M_{☉} has been calculated for the BCG based on its K-band bulge luminosity.
