= QSO J0931+3204 =

Second largest giant radio quasar, one of the largest galaxies

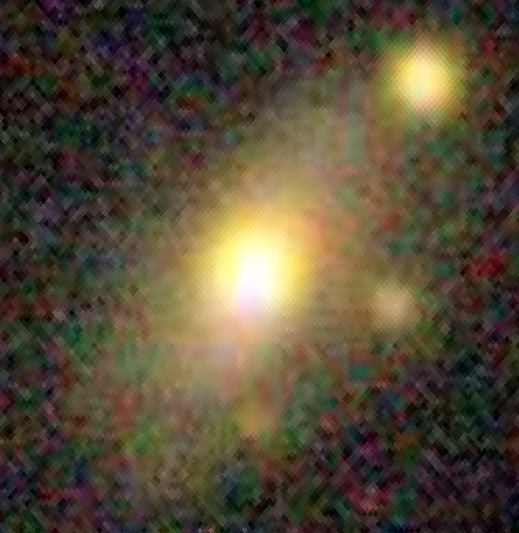
- DESI Legacy DR10 image of QSO J0931+3204

Observation data (J2000 epoch)
- Constellation: Leo
- Right ascension: 09^{h} 31^{m} 39.04^{s}
- Declination: +32° 04' 00.08"
- Redshift: 0.22551
- Heliocentric radial velocity: 60138
- Distance: 3.2647 bly (1,000.97 mpc)
- Apparent magnitude (V): 18.76

Characteristics
- Type: E?
- Size: 865,600 ly (265.38 kpc)

Other designations
- LEDA 1978568, 2MASX J09313900+3204006

QSO J0931+3204 is a type I seyfert galaxy, quasar, and elliptical galaxy in the constellation of Leo. The galaxy is at redshift z = 0.022551, equivalent to roughly 3.265 billion light years (1,000.97 megaparsecs) away and has an apparent visual magnitude of 18.76. It was discovered in 2003 in the HyperLEDA survey of over 950,000 galaxies.

== Physical properties ==
QSO J0931+3204 is a large elliptical galaxy and is in fact one of the largest galaxies discovered. The galaxy is 865,600 light years (265.38 kiloparsecs) across based on a distance of 3.265 billion light years (1,000.97 megaparsecs) and an angular diameter of 54.8 arcsecs.

In the galactic center of QSO J0931+3204 is an extremely luminous quasar that has a luminosity of 2.04e+38 watts equal to 533.6 billion L_{☉}. The galactic center contains a massive 100 million M_{☉} central black hole which is accreting on huge amounts of matter, which is ejecting mass amounts of gas outside the galaxy forming radio lobes. It is possible that QSO J0931+3204 has binary central black holes (BBHs), however this is unlikely.

In 2020, it was discovered in the SAGAN survey that QSO J0931+3204 generated a 14.1 million light year (4.325 megaparsec) radio structure based on an angular diameter of 19.22 arcmin. At the time of discovery, QSO J0931+3204 was the largest giant radio quasar (GRQ) ever discovered however a newer 2023 article discovered a larger giant radio quasar designated FBQS J1318+2626 spanning 4.622 megaparsecs.

== See also ==
- List of largest galaxies, includes QSO J0931+3204.
- 3C 236, similar-sized radio galaxy.
