= RGZ J145039.8+441829 =

Radio galaxy in the constellation Boötes

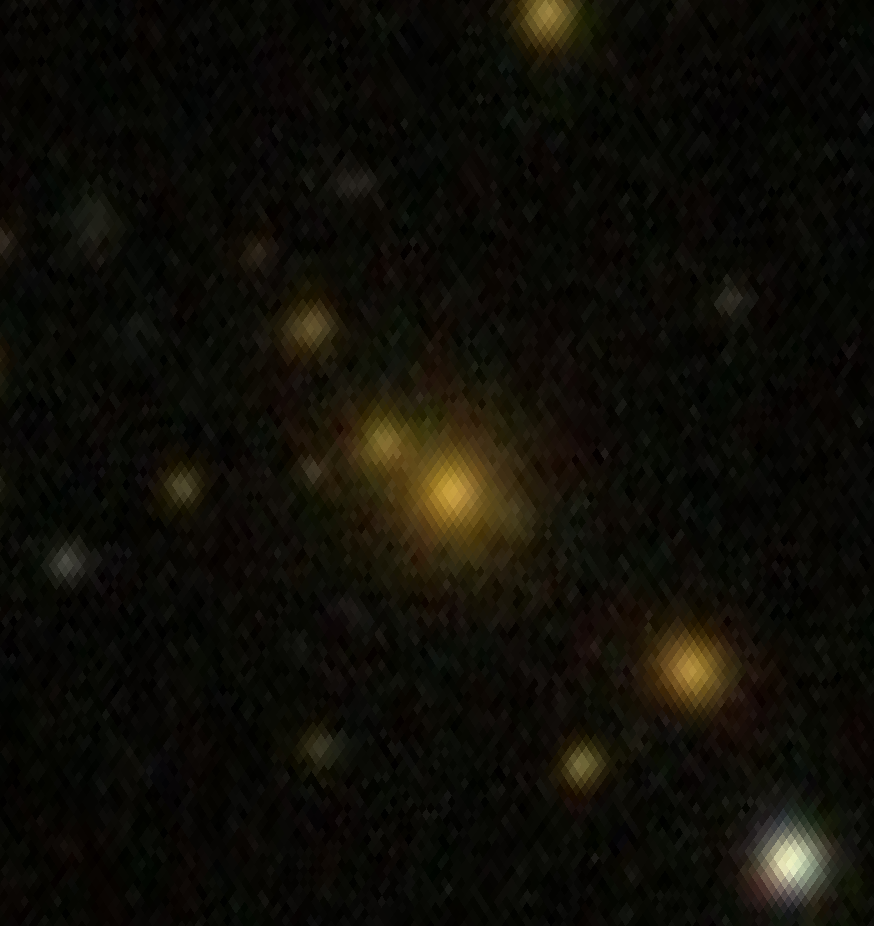
- SDSS image of RGZ J145039.8+441829

Observation data (J2000.0 epoch)
- Constellation: Boötes
- Right ascension: 14^{h} 50^{m} 39.82^{s}
- Declination: +44° 18′ 29.56″
- Redshift: 0.286252
- Heliocentric radial velocity: 85,816 ± 16 km/s
- Distance: 4,143.8 ± 290.1 Mly (1,270.49 ± 88.94 Mpc)
- Group or cluster: WHL J145039.8+441829
- Magnitude (H): 14.26

Characteristics
- Type: BrClG
- Size: ~806,000 ly (247.0 kpc) (estimated)

Other designations
- B3 1448+445, 2MASX J14503984+4418301, 6C B144850.1+443105, ATATS J145040.3+441834, GMBCG J222.66581+44.30814 BCG, 87GB 144850.6+443111, NVSS J145039+441831, OGC 0688, SDSS J145039.78+441829.4, LEDA 3489204

RGZ J145039.8+441829 also known as OGC 688 and J145039.7+441828, is a radio galaxy located in the constellation of Boötes. The redshift of the galaxy is (z) 0.28 and it is the brightest cluster galaxy (BCG) of the galaxy cluster, WHL J145039.8+441829.

== Description ==
RGZ J145039.8+441829 is a supergiant elliptical galaxy. The total r-band magnitude is 9.3 based on the r-band magnitude estimation made by the Sloan Digital Sky Survey (SDSS). The supermassive black hole lying in the center of the galaxy is 8.90 M_{☉}.

The nucleus is active and it has been classified as a narrow-line Fanaroff-Riley Class Type I radio galaxy. The estimated luminosities of both the hydrogen-alpha and doubly ionized oxygen emission lines are found to be 0.000 and 7.163 L_{☉} respectively. The radio lobes are resolved, with a total angular size of 133.54 kiloparsecs, and the lobes reach a maximum extent of 285.58 kiloparsecs in total. The total radio power is 26.32 W Hz^{−1}. The radio source has an S-shaped appearance with a source extent of 0.33 kiloparsecs.

A study published in 2022, also found it is a candidate wide-angle tail (WAT) radio galaxy, with a total radio flux density of 1.45 jansky at 150 MHz and 0.28 jansky at 1400 MHz. The radio counterpart separation is estimated to be 3.10 arcseconds while the total radio luminosity is 33.94 × 10^{25} W Hz^{−1}.
