= 6C 1132+3209 =

Radio galaxy in the constellation Ursa Major

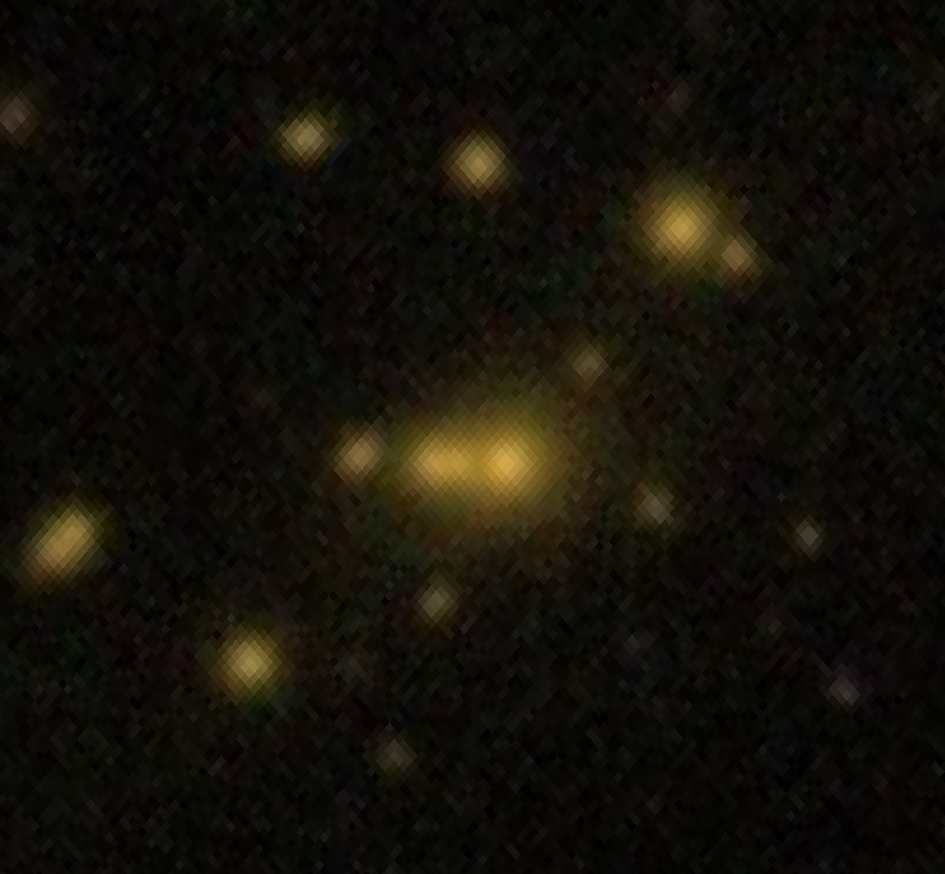
- SDSS image of 6C 1132+3209

Observation data (J2000.0 epoch)
- Constellation: Ursa Major
- Right ascension: 11^{h} 35^{m} 26.73^{s}
- Declination: +31° 53′ 32.59″
- Redshift: 0.231003
- Heliocentric radial velocity: 69,253 ± 12 km/s
- Distance: 3,345.3 ± 234.2 Mly (1,025.67 ± 71.80 Mpc)
- Group or cluster: GMBCG J173.86121+31.89240
- magnitude (J): 14.75
- magnitude (H): 13.97

Characteristics
- Type: BrClG
- Size: ~755,800 ly (231.74 kpc) (estimated)

Other designations
- B2 1132+32, 2MASX J11352669+3153324, 7C 1132+3210, LEDA 1969788, [BOG2010] 1262111, GMBCG J173.86121+31.89240 BCG, OGC 0671, [LHC2018] J173.86121+31.89240, NVSS J113526+315333, RX J1135.3+3153, SDSS JJ113526.69+315332.6, TXS 1132+321

6C 1132+3209 also known as J113526.69+315332.6 and OGC 671, is a radio galaxy in the constellation of Ursa Major. The redshift of the galaxy is estimated to be (z) 0.231 and it was first discovered from a sample of 3,235 astronomical radio sources by astronomers using the Bologna Northern Cross telescope in March 1970 where it is designated as B2 1132+32.

== Description ==
6C 1132+3209 is classified as a supergiant elliptical galaxy of Type E morphology, with its r-band magnitude estimated to be 16.75 magnitude. It is also a red luminous galaxy residing as the brightest cluster galaxy (BCG) of the galaxy cluster, GMBCG J173.86121+31.89240, also designated as MACS J1135.4+3153. The stellar mass of the galaxy has been calculated to be 11.36 M_{☉}.

The nucleus is active and has been classified as a Fanaroff-Riley Class Type I radio galaxy. The total flux density calculated by the NRAO VLA Sky Survey (NVSS) at 1.4 GHz frequencies has been estimated as 64.00 mJy. The total radio luminosity of the source is 24.99 W Hz^{−1}. The radio structure is compact with an elongated morphology and mainly described as having a single elliptical profile component. A radio core has been detected by the Faint Images of the Radio Sky at Twenty-Centimeters (FIRST) survey and it has a flux density of 61.08 mJy. The radio emission has a total flux density of 63.80 mJy.

The source has a steep radio spectrum. The flux density calculated by the Sixth Cambridge Survey of Radio Sources survey at 151 MHz frequencies is 0.63 ± 0.04 mJy. The total k-band magnitude of the galaxy is 14.50 within an angular aperture of three arcseconds. The rest-frame radio luminosity at 151 MHz is 24.84 W Hz^{−1} sr^{−1}. The source is also categorized as having an ultra steep spectrum, while the radio spectral index between 352 MHz and 1.4 GHz is -1.05α. The absolute magnitude of the galaxy has been calculated as -22.67.
