= J171328.4+274336.6 =

Elliptical galaxy in the constellation Hercules

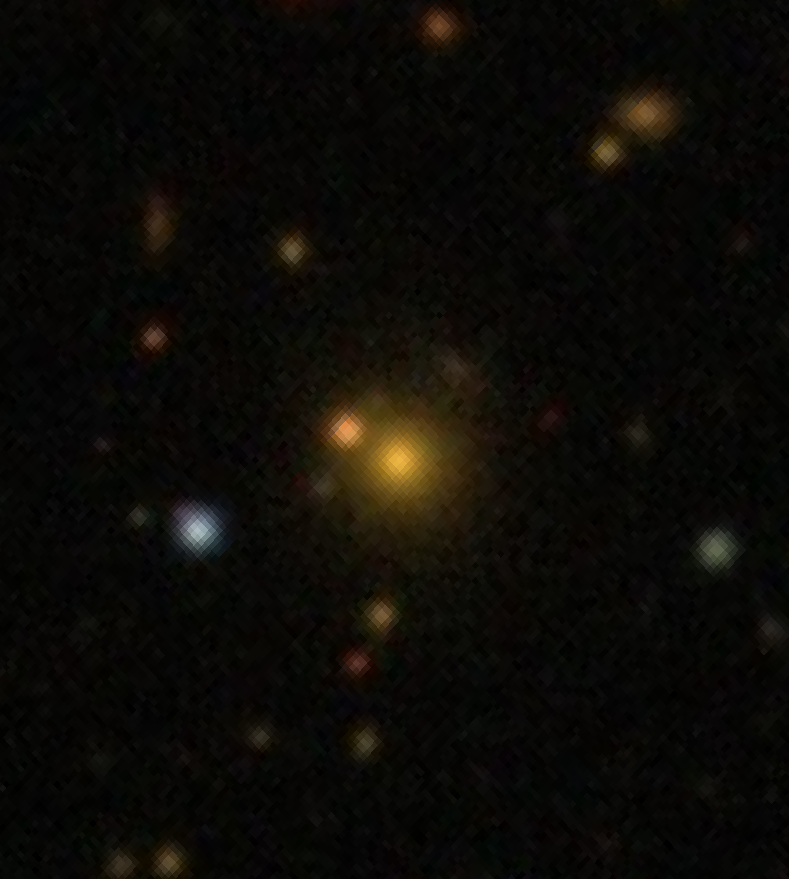
- SDSS image of J171328.4+274336.6

Observation data (J2000.0 epoch)
- Constellation: Hercules
- Right ascension: 17^{h} 13^{m} 28.40^{s}
- Declination: +27° 43′ 36.37″
- Redshift: 0.297127
- Heliocentric radial velocity: 89,076 ± 14 km/s
- Distance: 4,292.7 ± 300.5 Mly (1,316.14 ± 92.13 Mpc)
- magnitude (J): 14.64

Characteristics
- Type: E
- Size: ~781,800 ly (239.71 kpc) (estimated)

Other designations
- 2MASX J17132838+2743362, [BHF2008] 21, LEDA 1816387, OGC 0049, SDSS J171328.41+274336.6, WHL J171328.4+274337 BCG

J171328.4+274336.6 also known as OGC 49 and SDSS J171328.4+274336.6 is a massive elliptical galaxy located in the constellation of Hercules. The redshift (z) of the galaxy is estimated to be 0.297.

== Description ==
J171328.4+274336.6 is an elliptical galaxy with an R-band luminosity of 14.9 based on the luminosity value estimated by the Sloan Digital Sky Survey (SDSS). It is also one of the most massive galaxies, with an R-band absolute magnitude that is -24.28, and an R-band size that is 1.08 kiloparsecs (kpc). The total velocity dispersion for this galaxy is estimated to be 412 kilometers per second.

The galaxy is categorized as a "core" early-type galaxy with a galaxy effective radius of 4.49 parsecs and has an ellipticity of 0.171 ± 0.013. The dynamical mass of the galaxy is 12.09 M_{☉}. The supermassive black hole lying in the center of the galaxy is estimated to have a mass of 9.40 M_{☉} based on an M-sigma relation. The galaxy also has a total stellar mass of 42.7 M_{☉}, with it also being surrounded by a dark matter halo, with a dark matter component contributing 3% of the dispersion velocity. The half-light radius is calculated to be 11.2 kiloparsecs based on fitting an i-band de Vaucouleurs profile.

The de Vaucouleurs luminosity is -24.597 magnitude. The bulge-to-total ratio is 0.566, while both the bulge and disk radius is 7.67 and 18.67 kiloparsecs respectively, based on the de Vaucouleurs bulge plus exponential disk model. Dust has not been detected in the galaxy. The surface brightness profile is estimated to be 1372.29 based on a core-sersic parameter.
