= ZwCl 1693 BCG =

Brightest cluster galaxy in the constellation Hydra

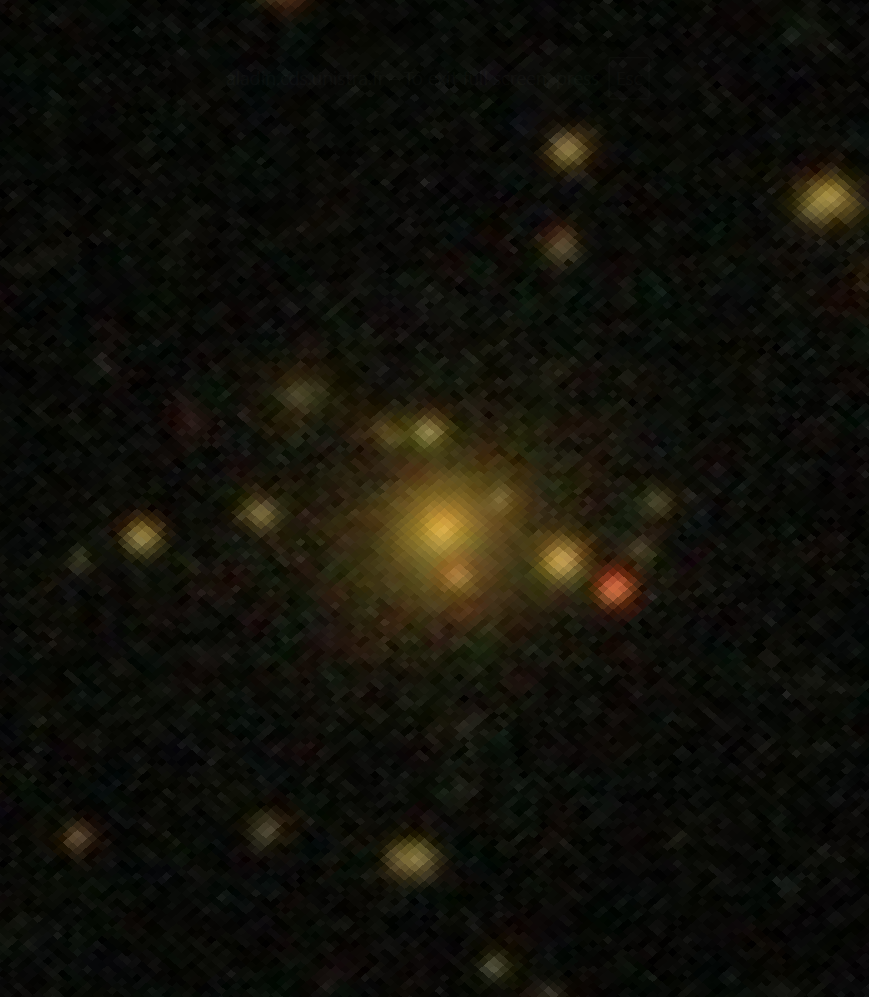
- SDSS image of ZwCl 1693 BCG

Observation data (J2000.0 epoch)
- Constellation: Hydra
- Right ascension: 08^{h} 25^{m} 57.83^{s}
- Declination: +04° 14′ 48.40″
- Redshift: 0.225100
- Heliocentric radial velocity: 67,483 ± 14 km/s
- Distance: 3,239.5 ± 226.8 Mly (993.24 ± 69.53 Mpc)
- Group or cluster: ZwCl 1693
- magnitude (J): 14.26

Characteristics
- Type: BrClG
- Size: ~915,000 ly (280.5 kpc) (estimated)

Other designations
- 2MASX J08255782+0414480, GMBCG J126.49095+04.24674 BCG, OGC 0169, RX J0825.9+0415, SDSS J082557.82+041448.3, WHL J082557.8+041448 BCG, LEDA 3448269

ZwCl 1693 BCG (Short for Zwicky Cluster 1693 Brightest Cluster Galaxy), also known as OGC 169 and RX J0825.9+0415, is a massive elliptical galaxy located in Hydra. The redshift of the galaxy is (z) 0.225 and it is the brightest cluster galaxy of the galaxy cluster ZwCl 1693, which is known as ZwCl 0823.2+0425.

ZwCl 1693 BCG is an elliptical galaxy with an r-band luminosity of 11.8 magnitude based on an r-band estimation made by the Sloan Digital Sky Survey (SDSS). It is classified as part of the fossil group, where it dominates the center of the group with an estimated half viral radius of 1.249 arcmin. It is also an X-ray source, with the source to the center of the galaxy estimated to have a distance of 21.4 arcseconds. The X-ray emission peak and the galaxy are estimated to be separated by 3.58 kiloparsecs.

The total infrared luminosity of the BCG is found to be less than 13.0 mJy at 100 micrometers while at 500 micrometers, the luminosity is less than 20.4 mJy. The stellar mass of the BCG has been calculated as 0.60 × 10^{12} M_{☉} based on a study of stellar masses of 160 BCGs conducted in 2012. Another study published in 2020, calculated its stellar mass as 11.53 ± 0.08 M_{ʘ,} with an estimated stellar velocity dispersion of 319 ± 16 kilometers per seconds. There are no detections of any hydrogen-alpha emission.
