= Limits of integration =

Upper and lower limits applied in definite integration

In calculus and mathematical analysis the limits of integration (or bounds of integration) of the integral
$$\int_a^b f(x) \, dx$$

of a Riemann integrable function $f$ defined on a closed and bounded interval are the real numbers $a$ and $b$ (the bounds of the interval), in which $a$ is called the lower limit and $b$ the upper limit. The bounded region can be seen as the area between $a$ and $b$.

For example, the function $f(x)=x^3$ is defined on the interval $[2, 4]$
$$\int_2^4 x^3 \, dx$$
with the limits of integration being $2$ and $4$.

== Integration by Substitution (U-Substitution) ==
In Integration by substitution, the limits of integration will change due to the new function being integrated. With the function that is being derived, $a$ and $b$ are solved for $f(u)$. In general,
$$\int_a^b f(g(x))g'(x) \ dx = \int_{g(a)}^{g(b)} f(u) \ du$$
where $u=g(x)$ and $du=g'(x)\ dx$. Thus, $a$ and $b$ will be solved in terms of $u$; the lower bound is $g(a)$ and the upper bound is $g(b)$.

For example,
$$\int_0^2 2x\cos(x^2)dx = \int_0^4\cos(u) \, du$$

where $u=x^2$ and $du=2xdx$. Thus, $f(0)=0^2=0$ and $f(2)=2^2=4$. Hence, the new limits of integration are $0$ and $4$.

The same applies for other substitutions.

== Improper integrals ==
Limits of integration can also be defined for improper integrals, with the limits of integration of both
$$\lim_{z \to a^+} \int_z^b f(x) \, dx$$
and
$$\lim_{z \to b^-} \int_a^z f(x) \, dx$$
again being a and b. For an improper integral
$$\int_a^\infty f(x) \, dx$$
or
$$\int_{-\infty}^b f(x) \, dx$$
the limits of integration are a and ∞, or −∞ and b, respectively.

== Definite Integrals ==
If $c\in(a,b)$, then
$$\int_a^b f(x)\ dx = \int_a^c f(x)\ dx \ + \int_c^b f(x)\ dx.$$

== See also ==
- Integral
- Riemann integration
- Definite integral
