= 4C +41.26 =

Galaxy in the constellation Canes Venatici

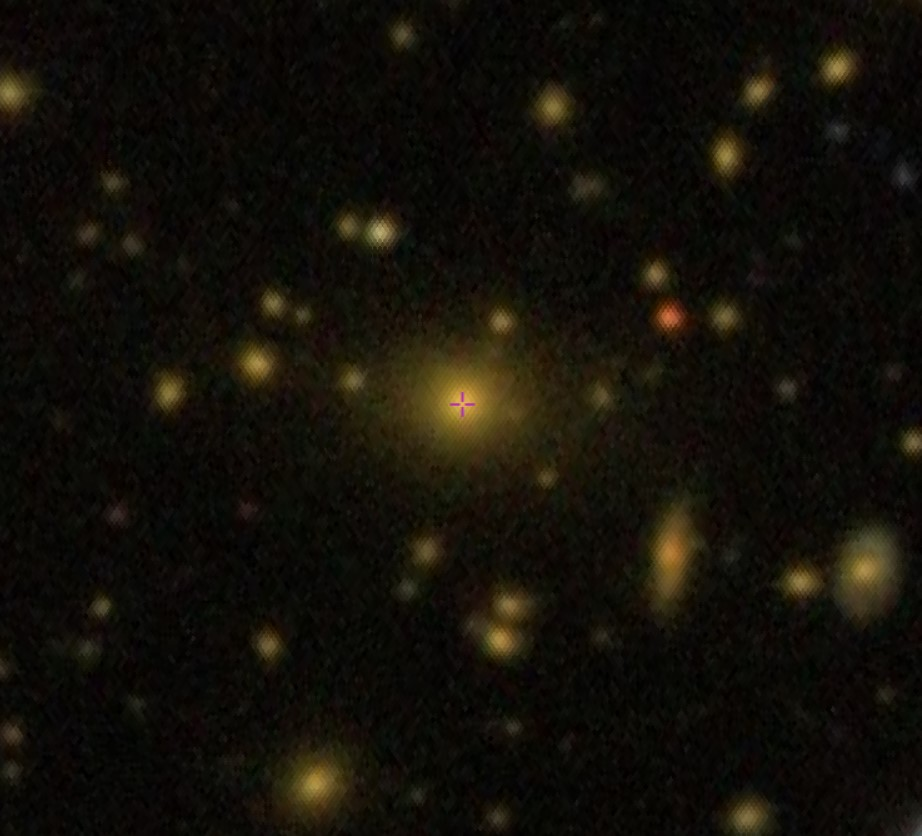
- 4C +41.26 captured by SDSS

Observation data (J2000.0 epoch)
- Constellation: Canes Venatici
- Right ascension: 13^{h} 35^{m} 20.09^{s}
- Declination: +41° 00′ 04.34″
- Redshift: 0.228300
- Heliocentric radial velocity: 68,443 ± 9 km/s
- Distance: 3,301.9 ± 231.1 Mly (1,012.37 ± 70.87 Mpc)
- Group or cluster: Abell 1763
- magnitude (K): 12.96

Characteristics
- Type: BrClG
- Size: ~861,000 ly (264.1 kpc) (estimated)

Other designations
- B3 1333+412, LEDA 2174167, TXS 1333+412, RX J1335.2+410, OGC 0110, 7C 1333+4115, 2MASX J13352009+4100041, ATATS J133519.5+410002, NVSS J133519+410004

4C +41.26 known as B3 1333+412, is a massive elliptical galaxy of type E located in the constellation of Canes Venatici. Its redshift is 0.228324, estimating the galaxy to be located 3.3 billion light years away from Earth. It is the brightest cluster galaxy of Abell 1763 (ACO 1763).

== Characteristics ==
4C +41.26 is a wide-angle tail (WAT) radio galaxy hosted by a central dominant galaxy residing in the central region of Abell 1763. The galaxy is known to contain a double-lobed source with the radio power estimated to be 10^{26} W Hz^{-1}. The radio lobes are found resolved with the northern radio lobe notably being less polarized when compared to the southern radio lobe. There is a presence of a radio core with a total flux density of 3.23 ± 0.01 mJy although a study in 2015, has suggested the flux density is 72.83 mJy.

A radio image made at high resolution, showed a presence of a radio jet located at the southern part, cutting though a plume feature before ending at the spot of a compact region. This jet has a minimum pressure of around 1.8 × 10^{-11} dyn cm^{-2} and has a jet flux density of 5.07 mJy.

The galaxy has a total ultraviolet star formation rate of 1.06 M_{☉} per year, while the total infrared star formation rate is suggested to be 7.68 M_{☉} per year. The stellar mass of the galaxy is 4.18 M_{☉}. The core of the galaxy is depicted to have a red appearance based on its inner color shape profile with its surface brightness profile parameter measured as 24.47^{+0.19}_{-0.21} kiloparsecs. There are no detections of any hydrogen-alpha emission. A study in 2018, has found there is a presence of a supermassive black hole in the center with a mass of 10.12 ± 0.05 M_{☉} based on its K-band galactic bulge luminosity. The peculiar velocity of the galaxy is 650 kilometers per seconds.
