= Abell 1758 =

Galaxy cluster composed of two subclusters

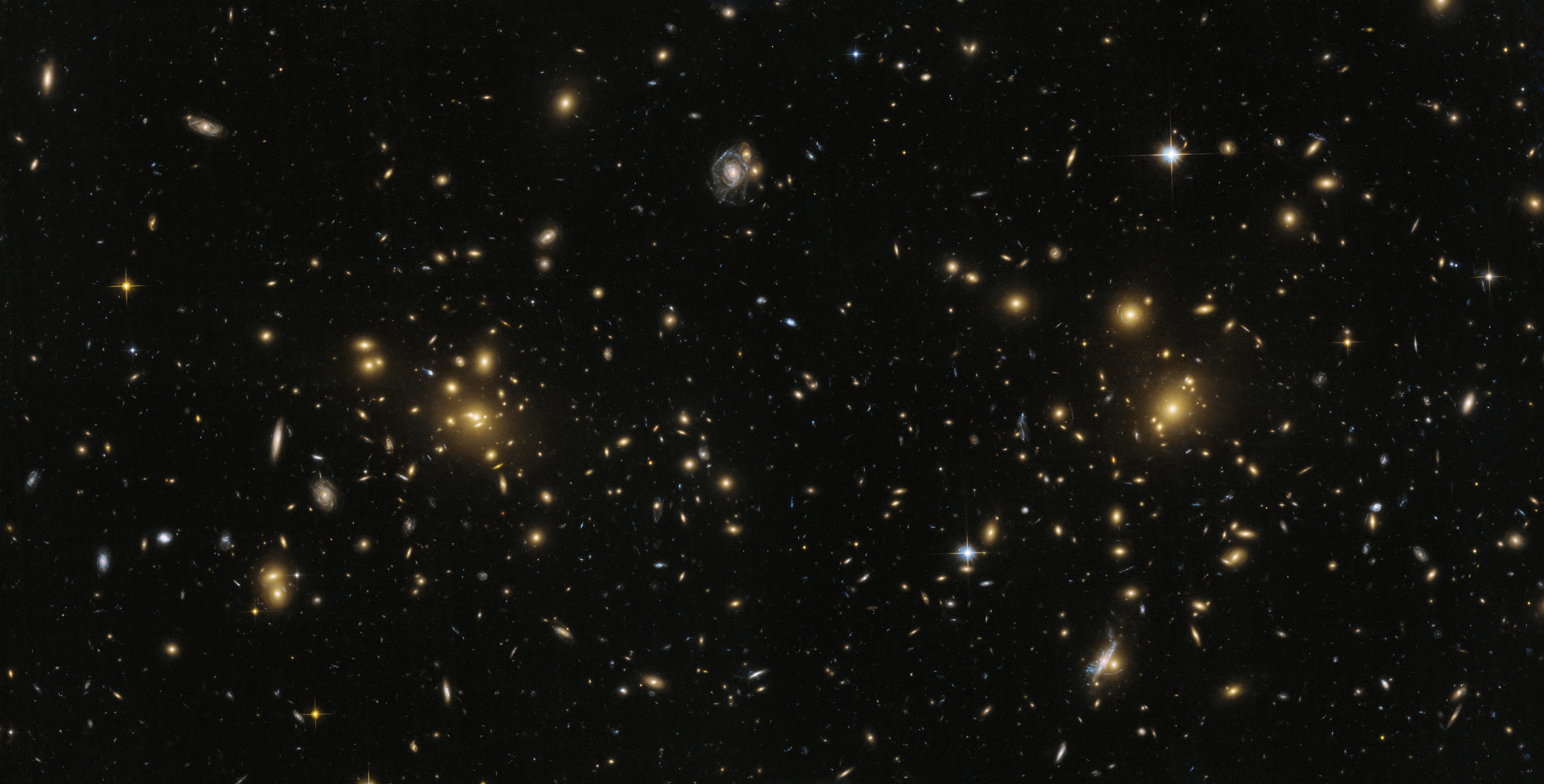
- Image of the northern part of the Abell 1758 cluster

Observation data (Epoch )
- Redshift: 0.279 mpc

Abell 1758 is a large system of two galaxy clusters separated by 2 megaparsecs (7 million light-years), the Northern cluster (Abell 1758N) and the Southern cluster (Abell 1758S). It is located at a redshift of z=0.279. The two clusters are slowly merging with each other and will eventually become a singular cluster, becoming one of the most massive objects in the Universe.

== Components ==
Abell 1758 is a massive galaxy cluster that has been divided into a Northern sub-cluster and a Southern sub-cluster.

=== Abell 1758N ===
The Northern cluster of Abell 1758 is the dominant cluster of the two and is elliptical shaped. It is also hotter than the Southern cluster with the western part being the hotter region in the area, possibly due to a recent merger with another galaxy cluster. It can also be divided into its east (Abell 1758NE) and west (Abell 1758NW) components. It has a high metallicity.

=== Abell 1758S ===
The southern cluster is not as elliptical and much cooler than the Northern cluster. It also has a deficiency in metals, particularly in the central region.
