= Abell 1942 BCG =

Galaxy in the constellation Virgo

Abell 1942 Brightest Cluster Galaxy
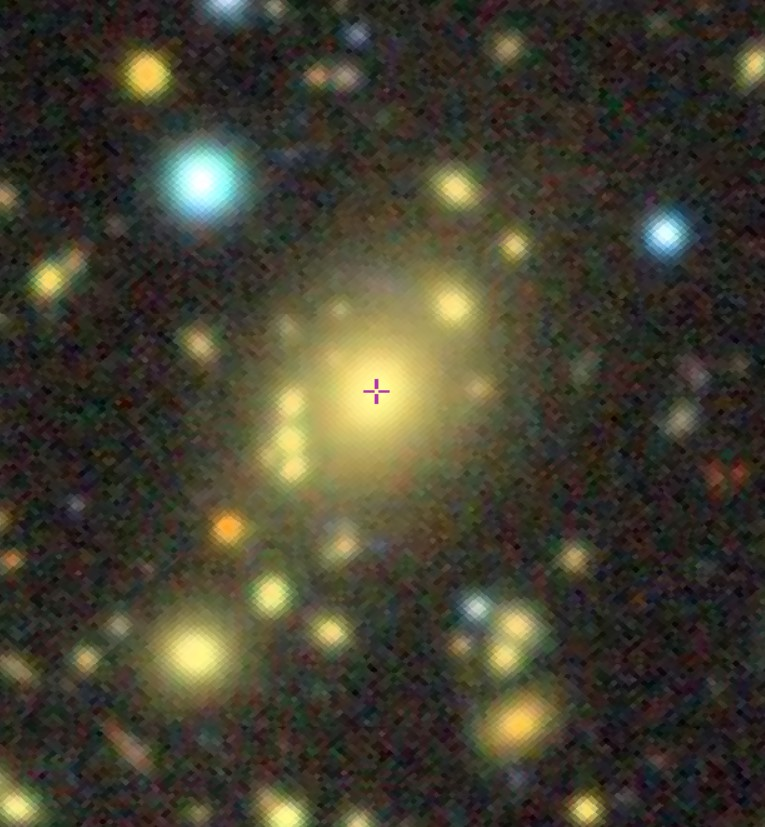
- Abell 1942 BCG, as seen by DESI Legacy Surveys

Observation data (J2000.0 epoch)
- Constellation: Virgo
- Right ascension: 14^{h} 38^{m} 21.87^{s}
- Declination: +03° 40′ 13.21″
- Redshift: 0.224679
- Heliocentric radial velocity: 67,357 km/s
- Distance: 2.731 Gly (832.3 Mpc)
- Group or cluster: Abell 1942
- Apparent magnitude (V): 0.118
- Apparent magnitude (B): 0.156
- Surface brightness: 17.9

Characteristics
- Type: BrCLG, AGN
- Size: ~938,500 ly (287.74 kpc) (estimated)
- Apparent size (V): 0.30' x 0.23'
- Notable features: Brightest cluster galaxy, radio galaxy

Other designations
- PKS 1435+038, 2MASX J14382188+0340138, LEDA 1256558, PMN J1438+0340, MRC 1435+038, NVSS J143822+034016, 2CXO J143821.8+034012

Abell 1942 BCG (short for Abell 1942 Brightest Cluster Galaxy), also known as PGC 1256558, is a massive elliptical galaxy of type-cD residing as the brightest cluster galaxy of the Abell 1942 galaxy cluster, located in the constellation Virgo. With a redshift of 0.224, the galaxy is located nearly 2.7 billion light-years away from Earth.

== Characteristics ==
Abell 1942 BCG is a luminous red galaxy observed by Sloan Digital Sky Survey, the total stellar mass of the galaxy is estimated to be ~3 × 10^{11} M_{solar}. It is also classified as an active wide-angled tailed radio galaxy. With an astrophysical jet speed within of the range (0.3-0.7)c and a peaked spectrum source of between 1.4 GHz and 325 MHz, Abell 1942 BCG is found to be radio-luminous with values below 10^{22} WHz^{−1} at 1.4 GHz.

Moreover, Abell 1942 BCG contains an extended radio source listed by researchers in the 408-MHz Molonglo Reference Catalogue and also Parkes Catalogue of radio sources. Its luminosity function is estimated to be frequencies of 400 and 2700 MHz.

Abell 1942 BCG is aligned along its major axis towards its parent cluster. It has a large galactic halo displaying a light profile with surface brightness ranging from 27.5 mag arcsec-2 at 100 kpc to ~32 mag arcsec-2 at 700 kpc as observed through r-bands. Such of these light profiles in massive galaxies like Abell 1942 BCG tend to reach up to several hundreds of kilometers. Because Abell 1942 BCG has special properties, researchers theorized it might have been formed through the process of galactic cannibalism as the galaxy merges with its surrounding satellite galaxies thus increasing its luminosity. As merger process continues, the mass of Abell 1942 BCG is build-up while at the same time, the number of satellite galaxies reduces.

The star formation in Abell 1942 BCG, is estimated to contribute less mass friction and a stellar age of 200 Myr. Because the galaxy host's cluster has X-ray properties and the young star population, this strongly hints the star formation of Abell 1942 BCG is fueled by gas cooling out of the intracluster medium. As observed by Galaxy Evolution Explorer (GALEX), Spitzer Space Telescope, and Two Micron All Sky Survey (2MASS), researchers found the galaxy displays ultraviolet (38%) and mid-infrared emission (43%) from 8 to 160 μm, above as expected.

== Abell 1942 ==
The galaxy cluster where Abell 1942 BCG is residing, is found be a rich cluster. As observed by researchers, they found it has a mean redshift value of z = 0.22513 \pm 0.0008 and also a velocity dispersion sigma of = 908^{+147}_{-139} km/s. Through the analysis, they found the cluster is relaxed with no signs of remarkable features and a fair distribution of the X-ray emission traces.

They also found Abell 1942 has two possible optical substructures, seen at ~5 arcmin from the center towards the Northwest and the Southwest direction. However, they are not confirmed by the velocity field. The clumps are however, kinematically bound to the main structure of Abell 1942. Upon looking at the velocity dispersion through usage of the T_X-sigma scaling relation, they found the temperature is in good agreement with measured galaxies velocities.

According to researchers conducting a photometric redshift analysis, they suggest the weak lensing signal observed at the south part of the cluster, is contributed to dark matter concentration by background sources, that are possibly distributed as a single filamentary structure. Thus, they could use limiting magnitude of H = 22, for detection of such clusters with appropriate mass that have comparable redshifts with the mean redshift of background sources.
