= NGC 623 =

Galaxy in the constellation Sculptor

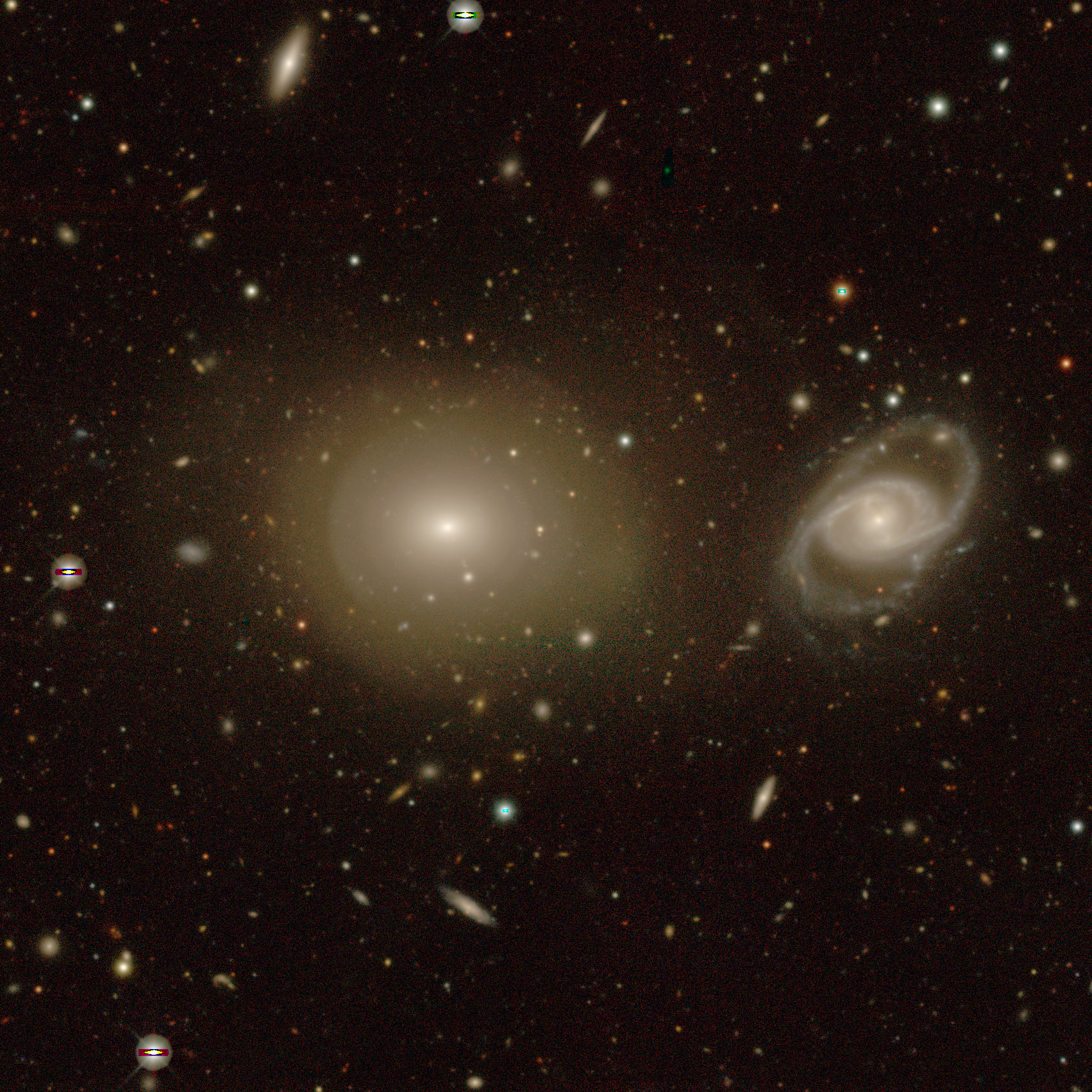
- legacy surveys image of NGC 623 (left) and NGC 619 (right)

Observation data (J2000 epoch)
- Constellation: Sculptor
- Right ascension: 01^{h} 35^{m} 06.388^{s}
- Declination: −36° 29′ 24.80″
- Redshift: 0.029871
- Heliocentric radial velocity: 8821 km/s
- Distance: 396.1 Mly (121.43 Mpc)
- Apparent magnitude (B): 13.32

Characteristics
- Type: E/S0
- Size: 246.49 kiloparsecs (804,000 light-years) (diameter; 27.0 B-mag arcsec^{−2})

Other designations
- ESO 353- G 023, MCG -06-04-052, PGC 5898

NGC 623 is a large elliptical galaxy located in the constellation Sculptor at a distance of about 400 million light-years away from the Milky Way. It was discovered by British astronomer John Herschel on 30 November 1837.

== See also ==
- List of NGC objects (1–1000)
