= Abell 963 BCG =

Type-cD galaxy in the constellation Leo Minor

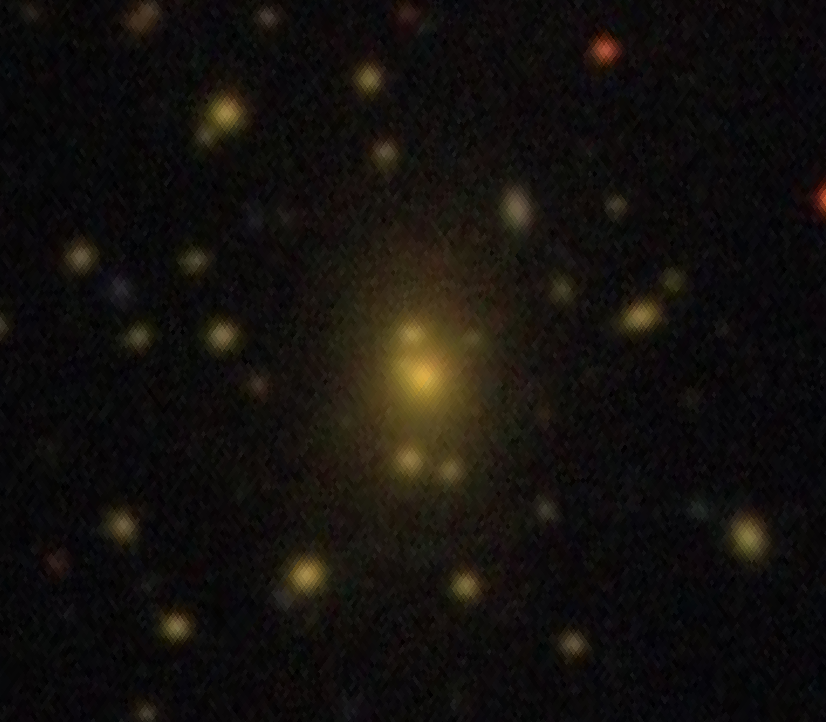
- SDSS image of Abell 963 BCG.

Observation data (J2000.0 epoch)
- Constellation: Leo Minor
- Right ascension: 10^{h} 17^{m} 03.64^{s}
- Declination: +39° 02′ 49.85″
- Redshift: 0.205607
- Heliocentric radial velocity: 61,640 ± 9 km/s
- Distance: 2,965.0 ± 207.5 Mly (909.06 ± 63.63 Mpc)
- Group or cluster: Abell 963
- magnitude (J): 14.15
- magnitude (H): 13.05

Characteristics
- Type: BrCIG
- Size: ~841,000 ly (257.7 kpc) (estimated)

Other designations
- 2MASX J10170363+3902500, Abell 0963:[BHB2008] BCG, LEDA 2142331, OGC 0046, RX J1017.0+3902, SDSS J101703.63+390249.3, WHL J101703.6+390249 BCG

Abell 963 BCG (short for Abell 963 Brightest Cluster Galaxy) is a massive elliptical galaxy of Type-cD located in the constellation of Leo Minor. The redshift of the galaxy is (z) 0.205 and it was first discovered in November 1965 by astronomers who categorized it as a supergiant galaxy which possibly contains a double nucleus. It is the brightest cluster galaxy of an X-ray luminous galaxy cluster Abell 963.

== Description ==
Abell 963 BCG is the central dominant galaxy of Abell 963. It displays no signs of any emission lines in its optical spectrum. It is also categorized as a fossil galaxy, with an estimated luminosity of 7.08 ± 0.21 × 10^{11} L_{☉} and a total stellar mass of 1.56 × 10^{12} M_{☉}. The age of the BCG is estimated to be around 10.8 billion years.

The core of the BCG has a red appearance based on its color profile shape. The total ultraviolet (UV) star formation has been estimated as 2.70 M_{☉} per year. A central velocity dispersion of 337 ± 6 kilometers per second has been calculated for the BCG.

A study in June 1988 reported two patchy blue arc structures positioned on both sides of the BCG. The arc structures are located within the extended envelope of the BCG. The first arc is estimated to be located 18.5 arcseconds, with a position angle of 70°, while the other arc is located 12 arcseconds away from the BCG's center with a position angle of 30°. The BCG itself is both large and has an elliptical appearance with an estimated axis diameter of 110 kiloparsecs. The major axis of the BCG also bisects one or both arc structures.
