= B3 1715+425 =

Naked black hole in Hercules

- Object type: Radio source

Observation data (Epoch J2000)
- Right ascension: 17^{h} 17^{m} 19.21^{s}
- Declination: +42° 26′ 59.85″
- Redshift: 0.1754

B3 1715+425 is an astronomical radio source which is theorized to be a nearly naked black hole.

== Discovery ==
B3 1715+425 was discovered during a systematic search for supermassive black holes (SMBH) by James Condon and his team at the National Radio Astronomy Observatory in 2016. Condon recalls how his team had been looking for “orbiting pairs of supermassive black holes, with one offset from the centre of a galaxy, as telltale evidence of a previous galaxy merger.” Instead, they found B3 1715+425.

== Description ==
It is speculated that B3 1715+425 was originally enclosed by a host galaxy, like most other SMBHs. Models predict that in most black hole collisions, the two objects will combine to form a larger black hole. However, in B3 1715+425's case, Condon speculates that a collision with a much larger galaxy resulted in most of the host galaxy for B3 1715+425 being pulled away, leaving it with a small remaining galaxy of diameter just 3,000 lightyears across (in comparison, the Milky Way Galaxy is 87,400 light years across). The galaxy responsible for removing most B3 1715+425's stars is an elliptical brightest cluster galaxy at the center of the ZwCl 8193 cluster. The galaxy shows a distorted morphology and a starburst, probably as a result of the interaction with B3 1715+425.
