= Abell 697 BCG =

Type-cD galaxy in the constellation of Lynx

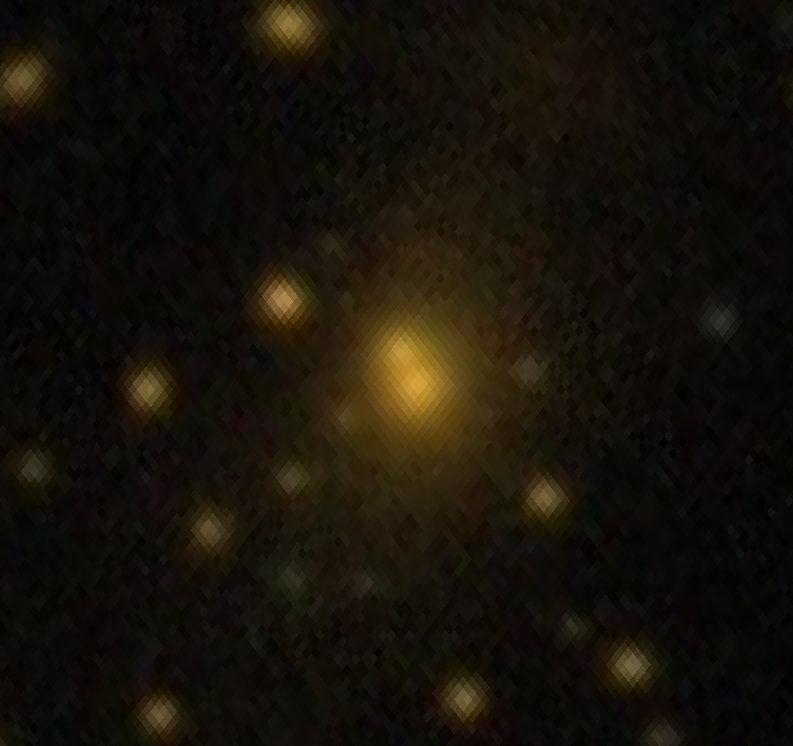
- SDSS image of Abell 697 BCG

Observation data (J2000.0 epoch)
- Constellation: Lynx
- Right ascension: 08^{h} 42^{m} 57.57^{s}
- Declination: +36° 21′ 59.70″
- Redshift: 0.282280
- Heliocentric radial velocity: 84,625 ± 12 km/s
- Distance: 4,069.8 ± 284.9 Mly (1,247.82 ± 87.35 Mpc)
- Group or cluster: Abell 697
- magnitude (J): 13.91

Characteristics
- Type: BrClG
- Size: ~647,400 ly (198.49 kpc) (estimated)

Other designations
- 2MASX J08425763+3622000, Abell 0697:[BHB2008] BCG, GMBCG J130.73982+36.36646 BCG, [HWH2012] 05, LEDA 2079433, OGC 0043, SDSS J084257.55+362159.2, WHL J084257.6+362159 BCG

Abell 697 BCG (short for Abell 697 Brightest Cluster Galaxy) also known as OGC 43, is a massive elliptical galaxy of Type-cD located in the constellation of Lynx. The redshift of the galaxy is (z) 0.282 and it is the brightest cluster galaxy of the galaxy cluster, Abell 697.

== Description ==
Abell 697 BCG is an elliptical galaxy dominating the center of the cluster. It displays a galactic halo, with its profile having a v band magnitude of 18.1. The halo has a roughly elliptical shape, but it becomes slightly asymmetric at a larger radius, with the halo's extension being visible up to 40 arcseconds towards the southeast. The BCG's isophotes on the inner sides are orientated in the position angle of 163°. There is a secondary nucleus in the northwest direction, with evidence of an extended low surface brightness feature from its center. It is suggested the halo of the BCG was formed though several galaxy mergers. The r-band luminosity of the BCG, calculated from the Sloan Digital Sky Survey (SDSS), is magnitude 15.1.

The total infrared star formation of the BCG is estimated to be 13.33 M_{☉} per year, while the total stellar mass is 13.70 × 10^{10} M_{☉}.

The core of the BCG has a red appearance based on its inner color profile, and the BCG is offset from the X-ray emission peak of the cluster by 20.3 kiloparsecs. The radio core of the BCG has a flux density less than 0.21 mJy in total, while the optical spectrum of the BCG lacks emission lines. The total radio power has been estimated to have a spectral density flux of 23.30 W Hz^{−1} at 1.4 GHz frequencies. It also belongs to a fossil galaxy group.
