= ZwCl 1305.4+2941 BCG =

Brightest cluster galaxy of ZwCl 1305.4+2941 in the constellation Coma Berenices

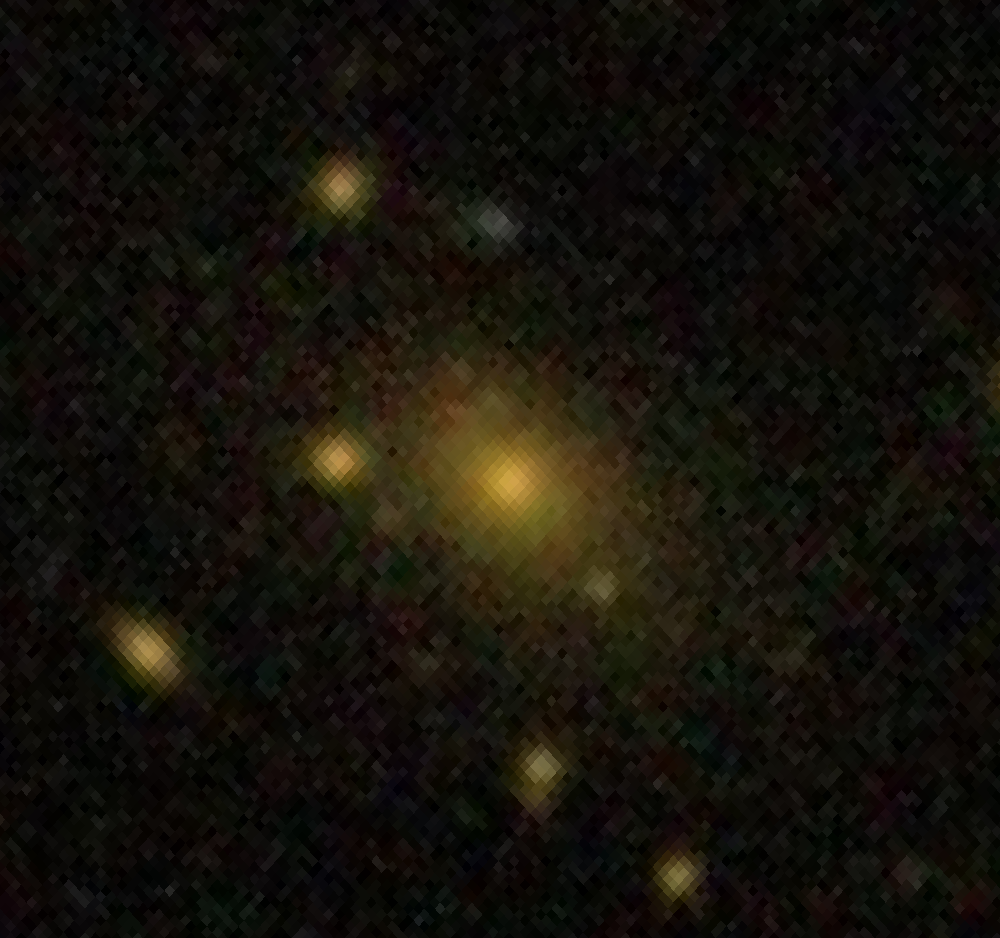
- SDSS image of ZwCl 1305.4+2941 BCG

Observation data (J2000.0 epoch)
- Constellation: Coma Berenices
- Right ascension: 13^{h} 07^{m} 49.20^{s}
- Declination: +29° 25′ 48.24″
- Redshift: 0.240642
- Heliocentric radial velocity: 72,143 ± 15 km/s
- Distance: 3,471.6 ± 243.0 Mly (1,064.39 ± 74.51 Mpc)
- Group or cluster: ZwCl 1305.4+2941
- magnitude (J): 14.32

Characteristics
- Type: BrCIG
- Size: ~1,025,000 ly (314.3 kpc) (estimated)

Other designations
- 2MASX J13074925+2925484, SA 057:[BHK94] 12053, NVSS J130749+292549, OGC 0094, LEDA 1866064, SDSS J130749.23+292548.2, WTSB 52W13

ZwCl 1305.4+2941 BCG (short for ZwCl 1305.4+2941 Brightest Cluster Galaxy) is a massive elliptical galaxy which is the brightest cluster galaxy of the rich Bautz-Morgan class 1 galaxy cluster called ZwCl 1305.4+2941, which in turn is located in the SA 57 field. The galaxy has a redshift of (z) 0.24 and is located in the constellation of Coma Berenices.

== Description ==
ZwCl 1305.4+2941 BCG is an elliptical galaxy with a total R-band luminosity of 12.8 calculated by Sloan Digital Sky Survey (SDSS) and a K-corrected magnitude of 16.48. It is also categorized as a Type-cD galaxy dominating the center of ZwCl 1305.4+2941 cluster. The central isophotes have a rounded appearance, with further evidence that the outer regions also display an isophotal twisting towards the small position angles. The estimated absolute magnitude of the galaxy in the J band is -22.82 +0.02, while the absolute magnitude in U band is -22.42 +0.03. There is an X-ray source that is coincident with its position, making the BCG an X-ray detected galaxy.

The BCG is also classified as a fossil galaxy with an estimated age of 10.9 billion years. The total luminosity is 6.71 ± 0.22 × 10^{11} L_{☉} while the specific star formation rate of the BCG is 12.13 M_{☉} per year. The total metallicity rate is 0.028%, while the stellar mass is 1.36 × 10^{12} M_{☉}. Radio imaging made with the Very Large Array (VLA) found it is a radio galaxy hosting a weak radio source called 52W013 with a total radio flux density of 2.76 mJy at 1490 MHz frequencies. In 1988, it was classified as a red radio galaxy, with the source having a small appearance with a straight radio spectrum over the spectral bands.
