= 6C B084407.8+582055 =

Radio galaxy in the constellation Ursa Major

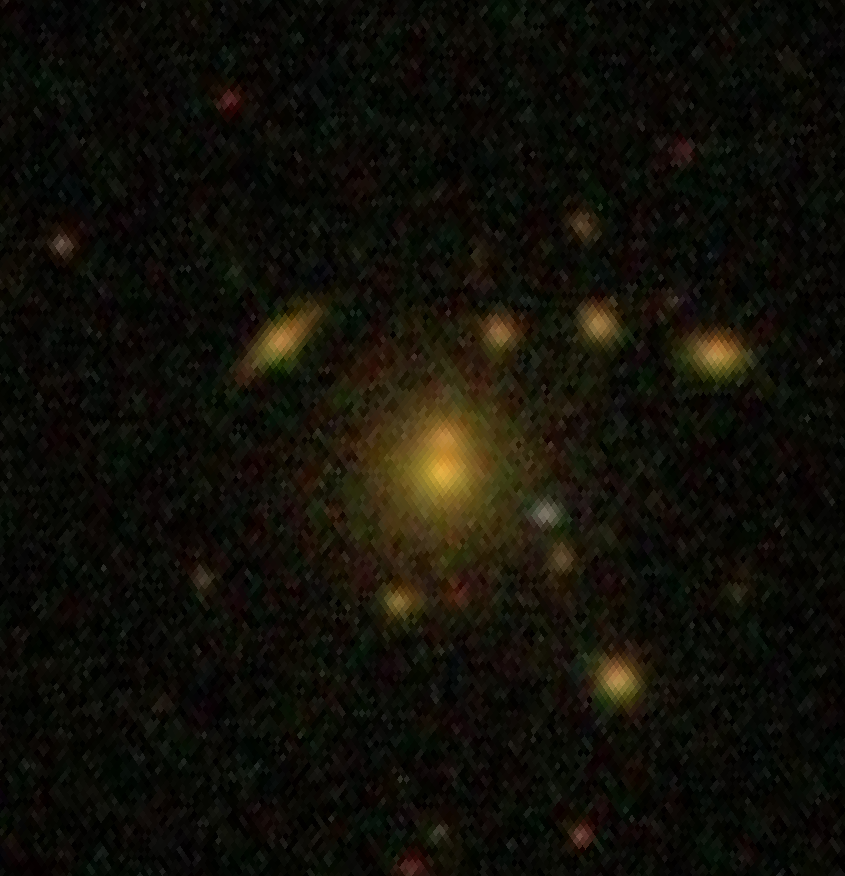
- SDSS image of 6C B084407.8+582055

Observation data (J2000.0 epoch)
- Constellation: Ursa Major
- Right ascension: 08^{h} 48^{m} 03.34^{s}
- Declination: +58° 09′ 48.43″
- Redshift: 0.221618
- Heliocentric radial velocity: 66,439 ± 10 km/s
- Distance: 3,199.2 ± 223.9 Mly (980.88 ± 68.66 Mpc)
- Group or cluster: WHL J084803.3+580948
- magnitude (H): +13.44

Characteristics
- Type: BrClG
- Size: ~967,000 ly (296.5 kpc) (estimated)

Other designations
- 2MASX J08480336+5809485, GMBCG J132.01393+58.16340 BCG, LEDA 2575310, RGZ J084803.3+580948, SDSS J084803.33+580948.2, NVSS J084803+580948, [WB2011] J084803.3+580947, WHL J084803.3+580948 BCG

6C B084407.8+582055 also known as J084803.3+580947, is a radio galaxy located in the constellation of Ursa Major. The redshift of the galaxy is (z) 0.221618 and it was first discovered from the Sixth Cambridge Survey of Radio Sources survey conducted by astronomers in 1990.

== Description ==
6C B084407.8+582055 is an elliptical galaxy with an E morphological classification. It is also categorized as a red luminous galaxy residing as the brightest cluster galaxy (BCG) of the galaxy cluster, WHL J084803.3+580948. The total r-band magnitude of the galaxy is estimated to be 15.93 magnitude. The central supermassive black hole lying in the center is 9.10 M_{☉}. The accretion disk has a luminosity of 43.95 ergs^{−1}.

The nucleus is active and the galaxy has been categorized as a Fanaroff-Riley Class Type II radio galaxy. The total angular size of the source is 27 arcseconds, while the total linear size is 96.47 kiloparsecs. The radio flux density at 1.4 GHz frequencies is 58.7 mJy. There are no detections of either a radio core or hot spot features. The total 1.4 GHz radio luminosity is 25.41 W Hz^{−1}. The radio source itself is straight at the position angle of 165.1°.

A study published in 2013, showed the radio lobes of the galaxy are indeed resolved, with the lobes having a total size of 48.24 kiloparsecs. There are also detections of both hydrogen-alpha and doubly ionized oxygen emission lines with estimated line luminosities of 7.061 and 7.068 L_{☉}. A radio jet is present with an estimated jet power of 44.47 ergs^{−1}.
