= MS 0440+0204 BCG =

Type-cD galaxy in the constellation Taurus

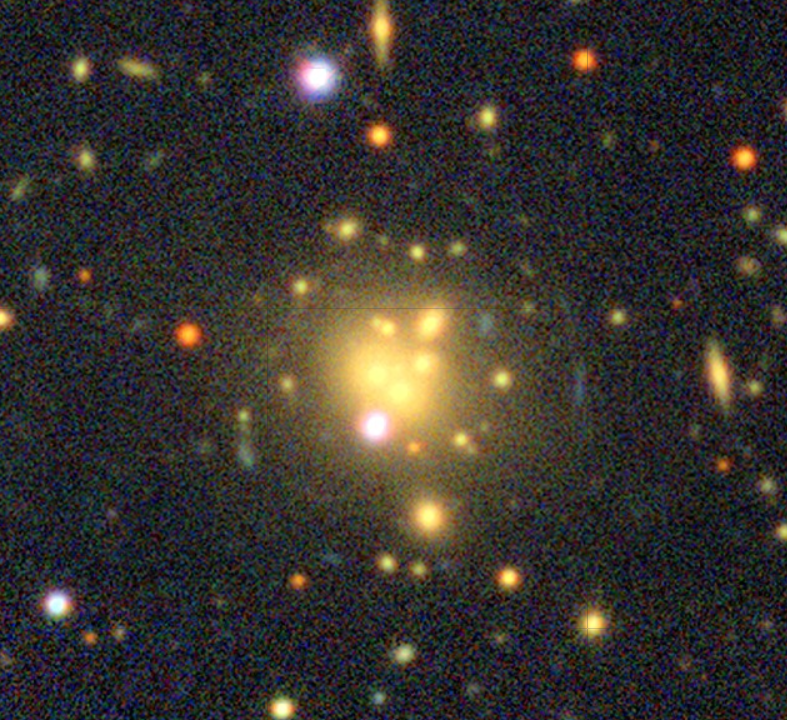
- DESI Legacy Surveys image of MS 0440+0204 BCG

Observation data (J2000.0 epoch)
- Constellation: Taurus
- Right ascension: 04^{h} 43^{m} 09.78^{s}
- Declination: +02° 10′ 19.83″
- Redshift: 0.198680
- Heliocentric radial velocity: 59,563 ± 39 km/s
- Distance: 2,862.2 ± 200.4 Mly (877.56 ± 61.43 Mpc)
- Group or cluster: MS 0440+0204
- magnitude (J): 13.23

Characteristics
- Type: cD
- Size: ~716,000 ly (219.4 kpc) (estimated)

Other designations
- 2MASX J04430994+0210190, LEDA 1218292, MS 0440+0204:[BHB2008] BCG, NVSS J044309+021013, RX J0443.1+0210, VLSS J0443.1+0210

MS 0440+0204 BCG is a massive elliptical galaxy of type-cD located in the constellation of Taurus. The redshift of the galaxy is (z) 0.198 and it was first discovered by astronomers in October 1993. This galaxy contains multiple nuclei and is the brightest cluster galaxy (BCG) located in the center of the MS 0440+0204 galaxy cluster.

== Description ==
MS 0440+204 BCG is categorized as a type-cD galaxy. It has a compact appearance and is made up of six close galaxies or components merging together to form a single giant elliptical galaxy. The velocity difference of the two known components is estimated to be 2,600 kilometers per second. A low surface brightness halo with a diameter of 157 kiloparsecs envelops the components. The core of the BCG has a red appearance with a total near ultraviolet magnitude of 21.84 ± 0.44. The total mass of the BCG is estimated to be 0.53 × 10^{12} M_{☉}.

There is an intermediate red stellar population in the BCG, but no presence of a young stellar component. The stars in the inner regions have an estimated age of 4,370 ± 160 million years old, while the stars in the outer regions are around 15,400 ± 6280 million years.

A study published in 1993, has found the presence of 15 gravitational lensing arc features surrounding the BCG based on charged-coupled device (CCD) imaging. The largest known arc has a length of 10 arcseconds, however it is unresolved, while the other arc features trace out a 90 kiloparsec radius. There are also detections of hydrogen-alpha emission, suggesting cooling flow may be present in the BCG. In 2009, the BCG was found to contain a radio source, classifying it as a radio galaxy. The radio power is estimated to be 34.2 ± 0.1 × 10^{23} W Hz^{−1} and the radio flux density is 30.2 ± 0.07 mJy.
