= NGC 6269 =

Galaxy in the constellation Hercules

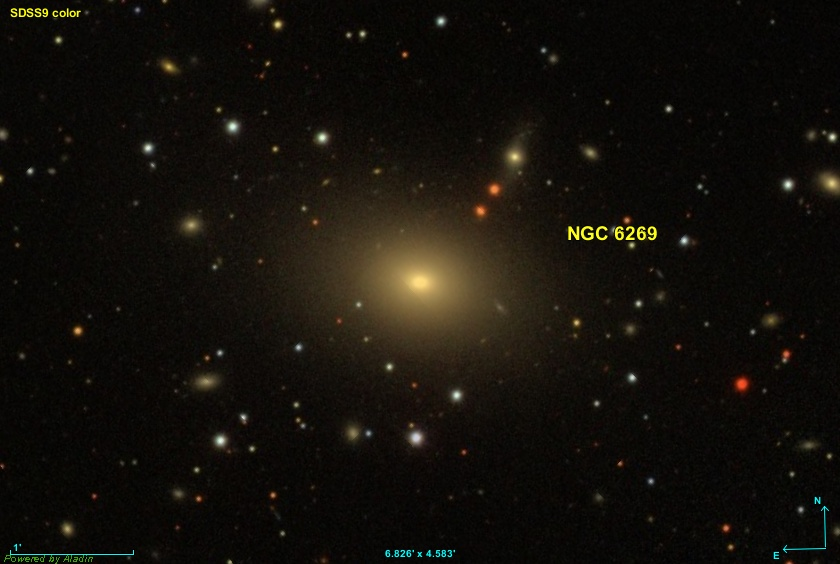
- SDSS image of NGC 6269

Observation data (J2000 epoch)
- Constellation: Hercules
- Right ascension: 16^{h} 57^{m} 58.10^{s}
- Declination: +27° 51′ 15.85″
- Redshift: 0.034801
- Heliocentric radial velocity: 10,433 ± 13 km/s
- Distance: 509.1 ± 35.6 Mly (156.10 ± 10.93 Mpc)
- Group or cluster: AWM 5
- Apparent magnitude (V): 12.4

Characteristics
- Type: cD;E
- Size: ~233,000 ly (71.3 kpc) (estimated)

Other designations
- CGCG 169-019, UGC 10629, PGC 59332, MCG +05-40-012, GIN 626, NSA 147539, AWM 5:[L84] G1

NGC 6269 is an elliptical galaxy located in the constellation of Hercules. The redshift of the galaxy is (z) 0.034 and it was first discovered by the German astronomer named Albert Marth on June 28, 1864, whom he described it as both small, round and also a faint object. It is a Type-cD galaxy.

== Description ==
NGC 6269 is the central Type-cD galaxy and the brightest cluster galaxy (BCG) of a poor galaxy cluster called AWM 5. It is categorized as a radio galaxy based on a radio morphology study published in 2007. However, the source located in the central region is mainly weak with a pair of resolved radio lobes located from north to south directions, extending from the center by around 25 arcseconds. The radio flux densities of the lobes are estimated to be 8 and 10 mJy. A further study has also shown most of the radio emission is mainly confined to a region located within the optical envelope. The central component has a misaligned radio axis based on imaging.

The stellar population in NGC 6269 is estimated to be at 0.95 ± 0.08 billion years, based on a study of stellar populations located at the central regions of brightest cluster galaxies, conducted in 2009. The active galactic nucleus (AGN) cavity is estimated to have a power of 0.02^{+0.01}_{−0.01} × 10^{44} erg s^{−1}. The supermassive black hole at the center of the galaxy is classified as now dormant and it has a mass of around 10^{9} M_{☉}. The total blue luminosity of the galaxy has been found to be around -23.63 magnitude.
