= Abell 1650 BCG =

Type-cD galaxy in the constellation Virgo

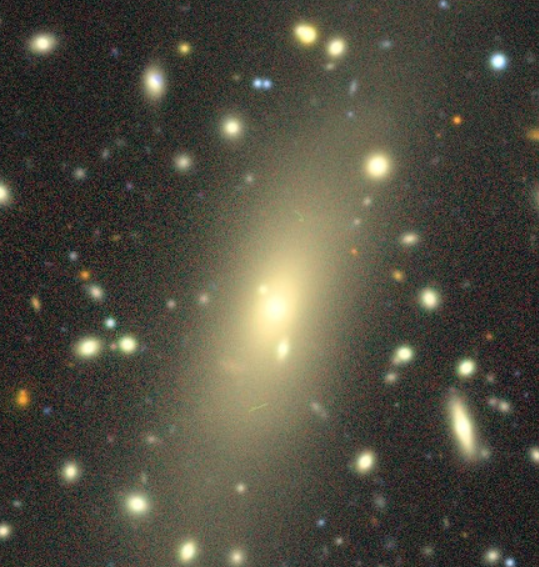
- DESI Legacy Surveys image of Abell 1650 BCG.

Observation data (J2000.0 epoch)
- Constellation: Virgo
- Right ascension: 12^{h} 58^{m} 41.48^{s}
- Declination: −01° 45′ 41.27″
- Redshift: 0.084565
- Heliocentric radial velocity: 25,352 ± 16 km/s
- Distance: 1,215.7 ± 85.1 Mly (372.72 ± 26.09 Mpc)
- Group or cluster: Abell 1650
- magnitude (J): 12.97
- magnitude (H): 12.21

Characteristics
- Type: cD;BrClG
- Size: ~626,000 ly (191.8 kpc) (estimated)

Other designations
- 2dFRGS N256Z066, 2MASX J12584149−0145410, Abell 1650:[FDE2024] BCG, APMUKS(BJ) B125607.22−012932.1, LEDA 1110773, OGC 0336, WHL J125841.5−014541 BCG

Abell 1650 BCG (Short for Abell 1650 Brightest Cluster Galaxy) is a massive elliptical galaxy of type-cD located in the constellation of Virgo. It has a redshift of (z) 0.084 and is the brightest cluster galaxy (BCG) of the Bautz-Morgan Type I-II galaxy cluster, Abell 1650, with an extrapolated magnitude of 10.31 ± 0.41 × 10^{11} L_{☉}.

== Description ==
Abell 1650 BCG is classified as a type-cD galaxy dominating the center of Abell 1650. The BCG is radio-quiet based on radio imaging by the Very Large Array (VLA) with no sign of radio emission associated with it. A faint radio source has been detected through deep imaging at 1.4 GHz frequencies coinciding with the BCG's position with a total flux density of 0.44 ± 0.09 mJy and a radio power of 7.6 × 10^{21} W/Hz. The optical center of the BCG is misaligned by 23 kiloparsecs towards the southeast direction along with the X-ray surface brightness peak. There is also evidence of X-ray emission around the BCG.

The U–R color magnitude of the BCG is estimated to be -0.05 ± 0.11, while the U–I color magnitude is -0.02 ± 0.11. A study published in November 2020, found the BCG has an intermediate stellar population with the inner population aged 6,640 ± 970 million years, while the outer population is aged 5,550 ± 370 million years. The core of the BCG has a red appearance. The total stellar mass of the BCG is estimated to be 7.2 ± 1.4 × 10^{11} M_{☉}. A supermassive black hole is at the center of the BCG ,with a mass of 7.58 × 10^{9} M_{☉}.

The BCG also displays kinematic properties. It has a central velocity dispersion of 412 ± 18 kilometers per second, while the rotation is measured to be 0.10 ± 0.07 V_{max}.
