= Holmberg II =

Dwarf Galaxy in the constellation Ursa Major

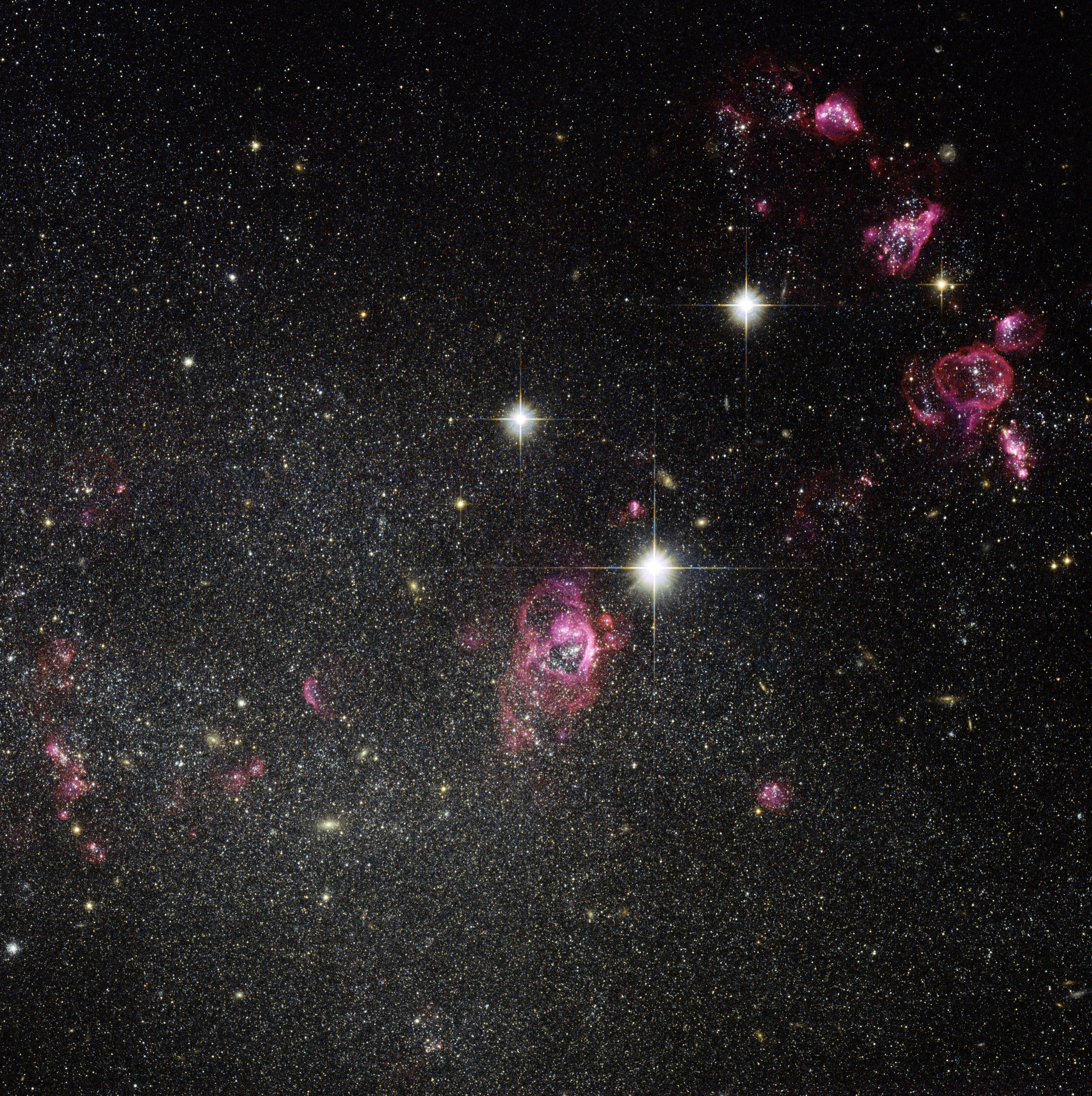
- An image of Holmberg II, NASA/JPL-Caltech/K. Gordon (STScI), SINGS

Observation data (J2000 epoch)
- Constellation: Ursa Major
- Right ascension: 08^{h} 19^{m} 04.98^{s}
- Declination: +70° 43′ 12.1″
- Redshift: 0.000474 ± 0.000003
- Heliocentric radial velocity: 142±1
- Distance: 11.06 Mly
- Apparent magnitude (V): 11.10

Characteristics
- Type: Im
- Apparent size (V): 7′.9 × 6′.3

Other designations
- UGC 4305, PGC 23324, MCG +12-8-33, IRAS 08140+7052, Arp 268, DDO 50, Holmberg II, KUG 0814+708

Holmberg II is an irregular dwarf galaxy in the constellation Ursa Major. Its apparent magnitude is 11,1^{m} and it is 11 million light years away from Earth. The galaxy is dominated by huge glowing gas bubbles, which are regions of star formation.

Holmberg II also hosts an ultraluminous X-ray source. One hypothesis suggests that is caused by an intermediate mass black hole that is pulling surrounding material. Holmberg II was discovered by Erik Bertil Holmberg.
