= NGC 4680 =

Galaxy in the constellation Virgo

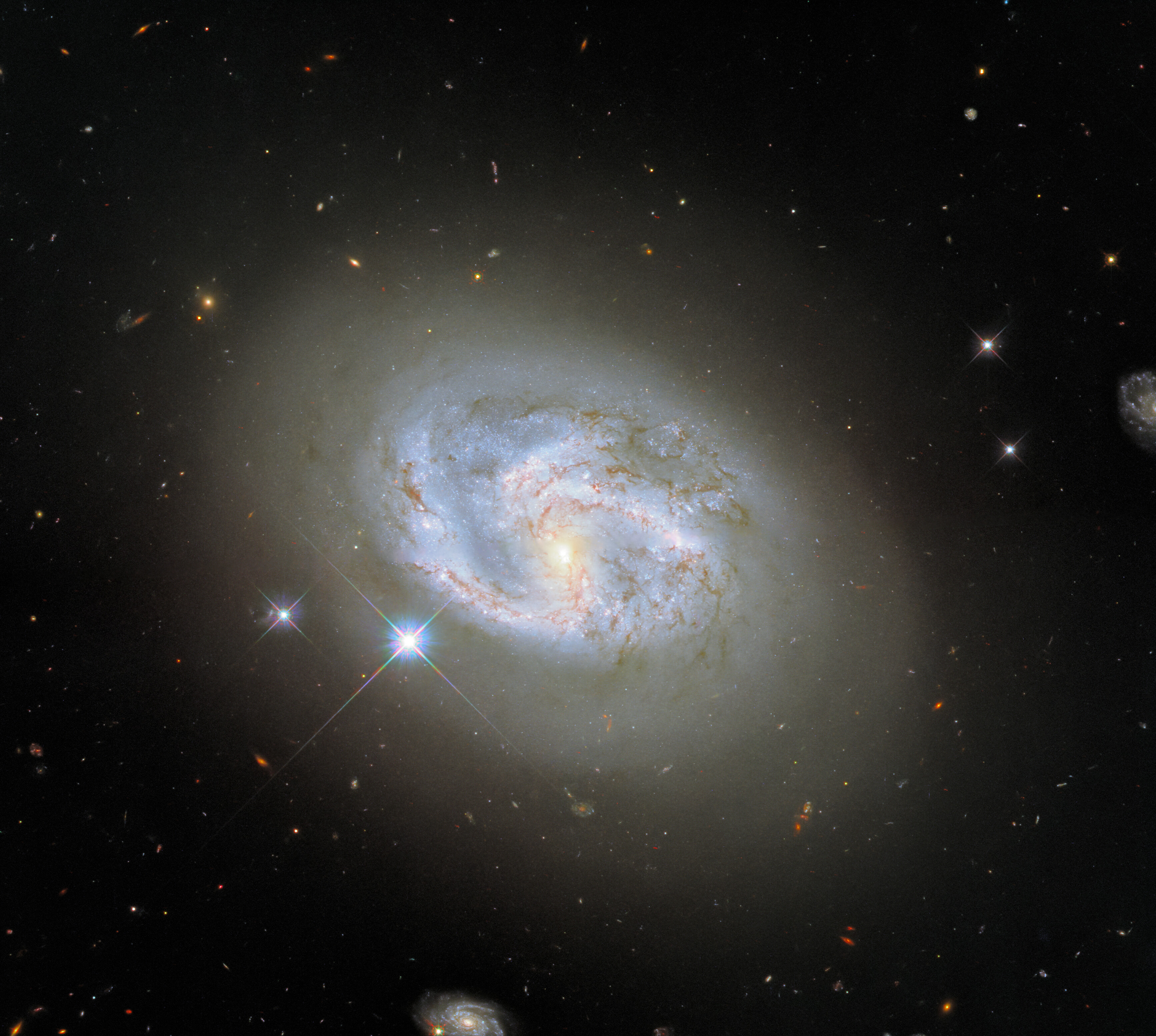
- NGC 4680 imaged by the Hubble Space Telescope

Observation data
- Constellation: Virgo
- Right ascension: 12^{h} 46^{m} 54.7221^{s}
- Declination: −11° 38′ 12.899″
- Redshift: 0.008312 ± 0.000030
- Heliocentric radial velocity: (2492 ± 9) km/s
- Apparent magnitude (V): 12,8 mag
- Apparent magnitude (B): 13,7 mag
- Magnitude (J): 10.703
- Magnitude (H): 10.058
- Magnitude (K): 9.774

Characteristics
- Type: Pec
- Size: ~50,700 ly (15.56 kpc) (estimated)
- Apparent size (V): 1.4′ × 1.2′

Other designations
- IRAS 12443-1121, MCG -02-33-007, PGC 43118

NGC 4680 is a spiral/lenticular galaxy in the constellation Virgo. It is estimated to be 106 million light-years from the Milky Way and has a diameter of about 45,000 ly. In the same area of the sky there are, among other things: the galaxies NGC 4700 and NGC 4708. NGC 4680 was discovered on May 27, 1835, by John Herschel using an 18-inch reflecting telescope, who described it as "eF, S, has one or two small stars entangled in it".

One supernova has been observed in NGC 4680. SN 1997bp (type Ia, mag. 13.8) was discovered by Robert Evans on 6 April 1997. NGC 4680 is part of a galaxy group known as NGC 4658 Group or LGG 304, NGC 4658, NGC 4680, NGC 4682, MCG 2-33-20, MCG 1-33-32 and MCG 2-33-10.

== See also ==
- List of NGC objects (4001–5000)
