= IC 1262 =

Galaxy in the constellation Hercules

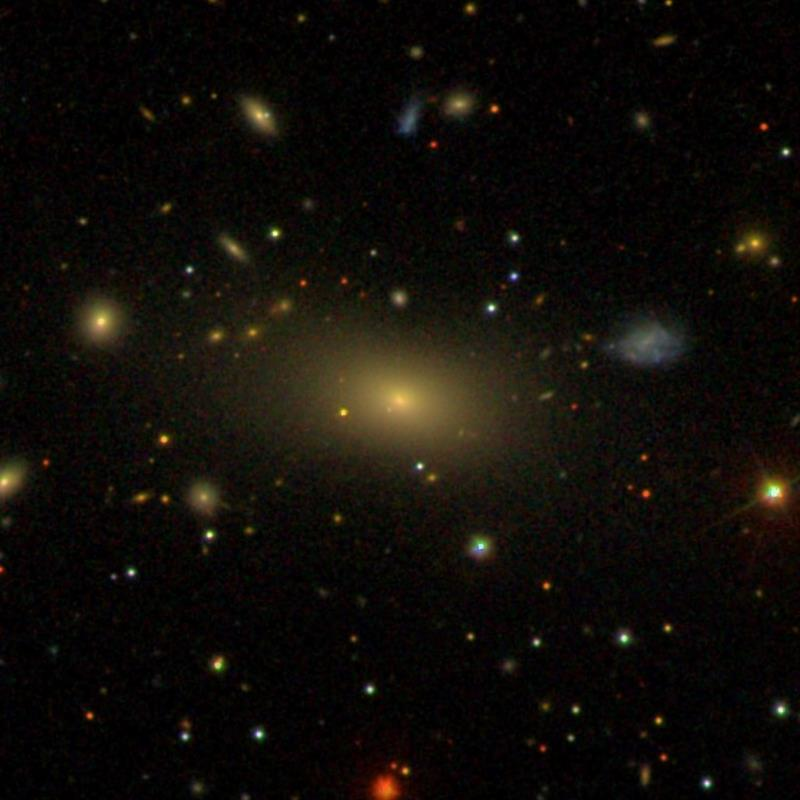
- SDSS image of IC 1262.

Observation data (J2000 epoch)
- Constellation: Hercules
- Right ascension: 17^{h} 33^{m} 02.04^{s}
- Declination: +43° 45′ 34.88″
- Redshift: 0.032649
- Heliocentric radial velocity: 9,788 km/s ± 23
- Distance: 451 Mly (138.33 Mpc)
- Apparent magnitude (V): 13.7

Characteristics
- Type: cD;E
- Size: ~230,000 ly (70 kpc) (estimated)

Other designations
- 4C +43.46, 2MASX J17330202+4345345, CGCG 226-025, GIN 639, PGC 60479, UGC 10900

IC 1262 is an elliptical galaxy located in the constellation of Hercules. The redshift of the galaxy is (z) 0.032 and it was first discovered by the American astronomer, Lewis Swift in June 1890, who described it as a 14th magnitude galaxy. it is the brightest cluster galaxy of a small galaxy group named after it, with at least 31 members and such is classified as a type cD galaxy.

== Description ==
IC 1262 is categorized as an early-type galaxy. When observed it is found to have a presence of an arc-feature located east suggested as a recent galaxy merger, with a high surface brightness and such also classified to be a bright source of radio emission. There is also a region area that is located northwards from the arc-feature which it is further separated into other regions, namely the high and low surface brightness region. The star formation of this galaxy has found to be only around 4.35 × 10^{−2} M_{☉} per year. It is also found offset from its X-ray peak.

The nucleus of the galaxy is active and it has been classified as a radio galaxy with an ultra steep radio spectrum. When observed, it has two extended radio lobes located in both north and south directions, with measured spectral indexes of −2.23 and −19.4. The flux density of the northern lobe at 325 MHz is estimated to be 341.2 ± 0.25 mJy whereas the southern radio lobe at 325 MHz is estimated to be around 855.1 ± 0.25 mJy. There is also presence of radio emission that found extending by more than 200 kiloparsecs over a wide area. Two inner X-ray cavities have been located north and south from the galaxy's center, with further confirmation of a much larger X-ray cavity on the outer side.

A filamentary structure has been detected in IC 1262. When observed, the feature is shown to have a sharp and narrow appearance and running from north to south direction. A loop feature is also found north of IC 1262 with a measured length of 20 kiloparsecs. Evidence also found the galaxy is surrounded by a halo of hot gas with a symmetric and smooth appearance.
