= NGC 5032 =

Galaxy in the constellation Coma Berenices

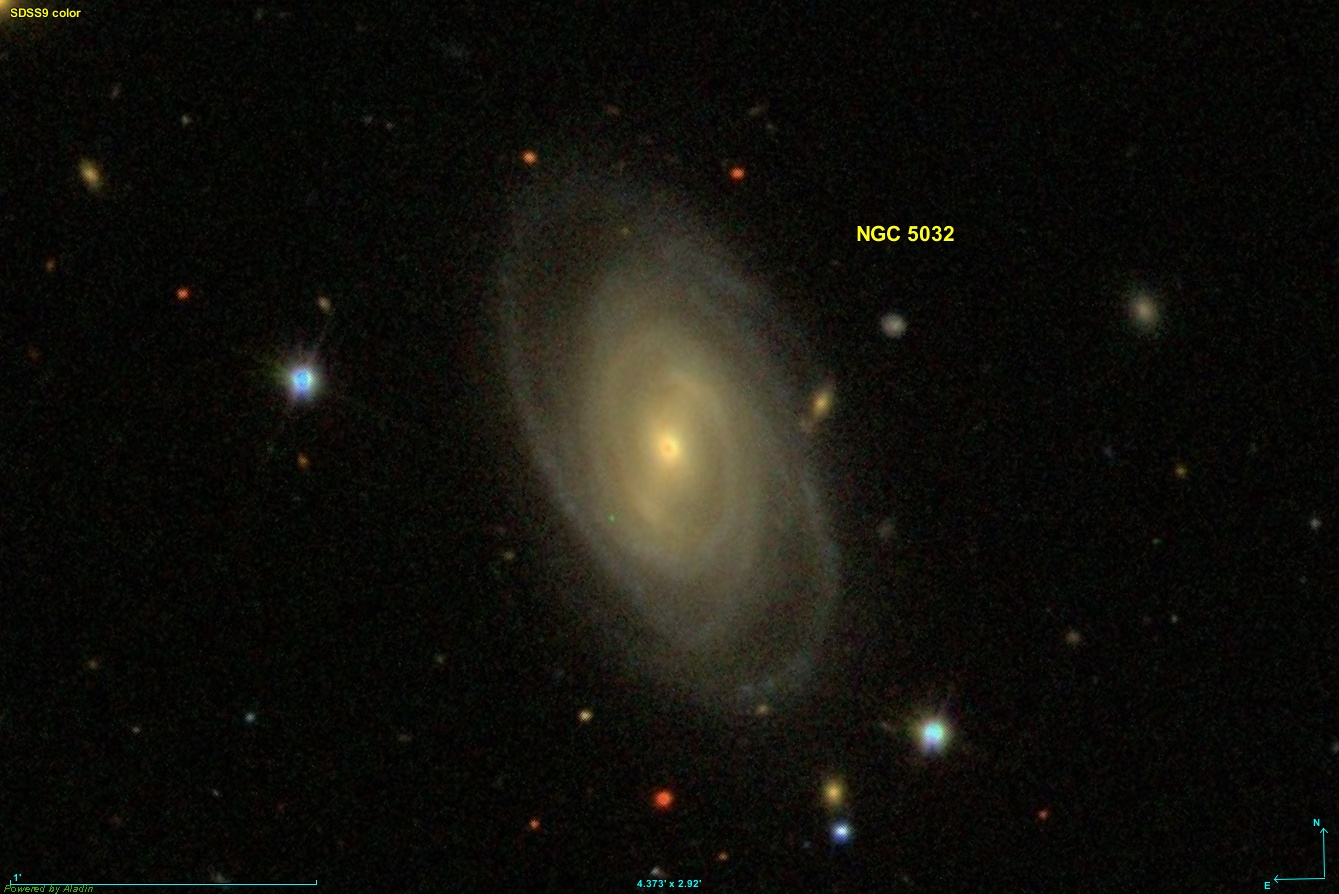
- The barred spiral galaxy NGC 5032

Observation data (J2000 epoch)
- Constellation: Coma Berenices
- Right ascension: 13^{h} 13^{m} 26.9471^{s}
- Declination: +27° 48′ 08.599″
- Redshift: 0.021398
- Heliocentric radial velocity: 6415 ± 1 km/s
- Distance: 321.1 ± 22.5 Mly (98.45 ± 6.90 Mpc)
- Apparent magnitude (V): 12.8

Characteristics
- Type: SB(r)b
- Size: ~223,900 ly (68.64 kpc) (estimated)
- Apparent size (V): 2.1′ × 1.1′

Other designations
- HOLM 513A, IRAS F00009-1101, 2MASX J13132694+2748086, UGC 8300, MCG +05-31-160, PGC 45947, CGCG 160-166

NGC 5032 is a barred spiral galaxy in the constellation of Coma Berenices. Its velocity with respect to the cosmic microwave background is 6675 ± 18 km/s, which corresponds to a Hubble distance of 98.45 ± 6.90 Mpc (~321 million light-years). It was discovered by German-British astronomer William Herschel on 11 April 1785.

NGC 5032 was used by Gérard de Vaucouleurs as a galaxy of morphological type (R′)SAB(rs)b in his atlas of galaxies.

NGC 5032 is classified as a LINER galaxy, i.e. it has a type of nucleus that is defined by its spectral line emission which has weakly ionized or neutral atoms, while the spectral line emission from strongly ionized atoms is relatively weak.

NGC 5032 forms an interacting galaxy pair with NGC 5032B. Erik Holmberg included the group in his catalog of double and multiple galaxies, with the designation Holm 513. NGC 5032 is also on the outskirts of the Coma Cluster, identified as ComaFC 370.

== Supernovae ==
Two supernovae have been observed in NGC 5032:

- SN 2016iuc (Type Ia, mag. 16.7) was discovered by the Gaia Photometric Science Alerts on 7 December 2016.
- SN 2024rkc (Type Ia, mag. 18.704) was discovered by ATLAS on 5 August 2024.

== See also ==
- List of NGC objects (5001–6000)
