= Abell 2390 BCG =

Brightest cluster galaxy of Abell 2390

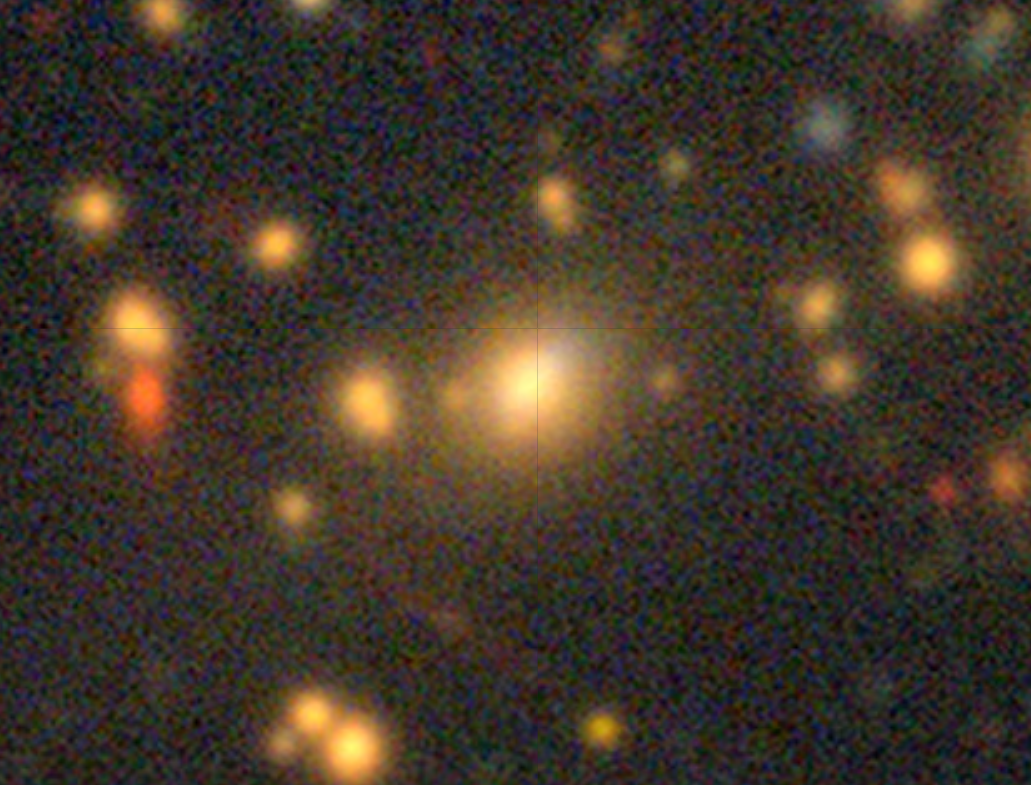
- DESI Legacy Surveys image of Abell 2390 BCG.

Observation data (J2000.0 epoch)
- Constellation: Pegasus
- Right ascension: 21^{h} 53^{m} 36.82^{s}
- Declination: +17° 41′ 43.72″
- Redshift: 0.230220
- Heliocentric radial velocity: 69,018 km/s ± 5
- Distance: 2.825 Gly
- Group or cluster: Abell 2390
- Apparent magnitude (V): 19.58

Characteristics
- Type: cD; Sb
- Size: ~582,000 ly (178.3 kpc) (estimated)

Other designations
- 2151+174, 2MASX J21533687+1741439, ABELL 2390:[BHB2008] BCG, LEDA 140982, NVSS J215336+174144, TXS 2151+174, SMM J21536+1741, OCARS 2151+174

Abell 2390 BCG (short for Abell 2390 Brightest Cluster Galaxy), is a massive Type-cD elliptical galaxy residing as the brightest cluster galaxy of the galaxy cluster Abell 2390. It is located in the constellation of Pegasus and has a redshift of (z) 0.230. It was first discovered by astronomers in the Very Large Array (VLA) survey in 1993.

== Description ==
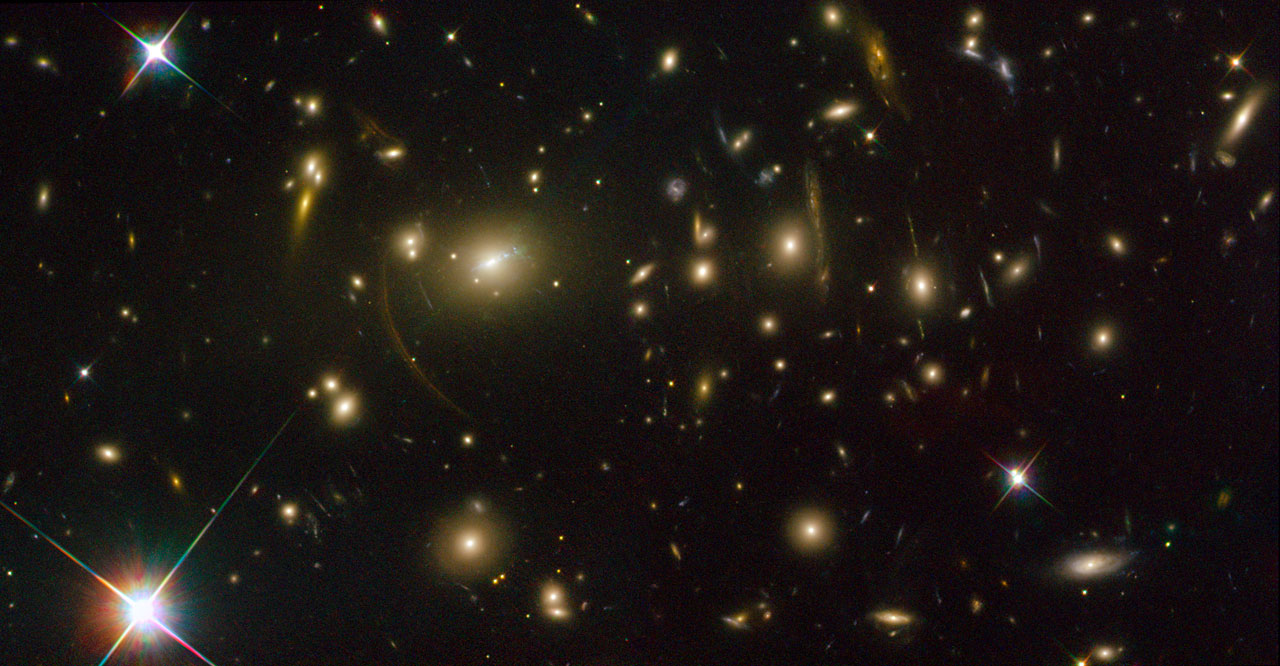
Hubble Space Telescope (HST) image of Abell 2390 BCG (seen on the upper left of the image).

Abell 2390 BCG is known to host a complex radio source with a flat radio spectrum. When observed through radio imaging, it is found to have a primary component that is made up of a radio core with an elongated appearance and several other components that are extended by 50 milliarcseconds. To the south, a much weaker component is found. Evidence also suggests it is a compact symmetrical object (CSO).

Deeper radio imaging made at multi-epoch frequencies reclassified it to have a Fanaroff-Riley class II morphology, that is combined with a medium-sized symmetrical object (MSO). When observed with both MERLIN and VLA, there is a compact component located 0.20 kiloparsecs with a position angle of -11° from the nucleus region. A secondary compact component is located at a further distance on the northern side of the source and has a distance of 0.48 kiloparsecs, with it almost resolved in a form of a blob feature. When observed further, there is a tertiary compact component located on the nucleus' other side with an elliptical appearance and at a position angle of 173°. A jet is seen to have a double structure and orientated from north to south.

Abell 2390 BCG has a filament feature containing active star forming regions. This filament is extended along the path of its main axis based on B-imaging. There are also emission lines in the optical spectrum of the filament feature. The star formation rate of the feature is estimated to be 8 ± 4 ^{h-2}_{50} M_{☉} per year. A mid-infrared emitting region was found inside the galaxy in addition, its size being 20 kiloparsecs and has a mass flow rate of 80 M_{☉} per year. In 2019, Abell 2390 BCG was found be a double-double radio galaxy with both radio lobes extending outwards in east to west direction, by around 600 kiloparsecs according to radio imaging made by Low Frequency Array (LOFAR).

Atacama Large Millimeter Array (ALMA) in 2024 detected traces of molecular gas inside Abell 2390 BCG. When observed, around half of the gas is mainly confined to a one-sided plume feature that elongates outwards from the galaxy center by 15 kiloparsecs. Based on results, this gas is receding at the furthest point at 250 kilometers per second compared to the center and has a positive, smooth gradient. The plume feature is also suggested to be created either by through jet-outflows or by ram pressure. Extended line emission was also discovered in Abell 2390 BCG in April 2023, shaped as a cone with singly ionized oxygen towards the north to west with a position angle of 42°.
