= Abell 478 BCG =

Type-cD galaxy in the constellation Taurus

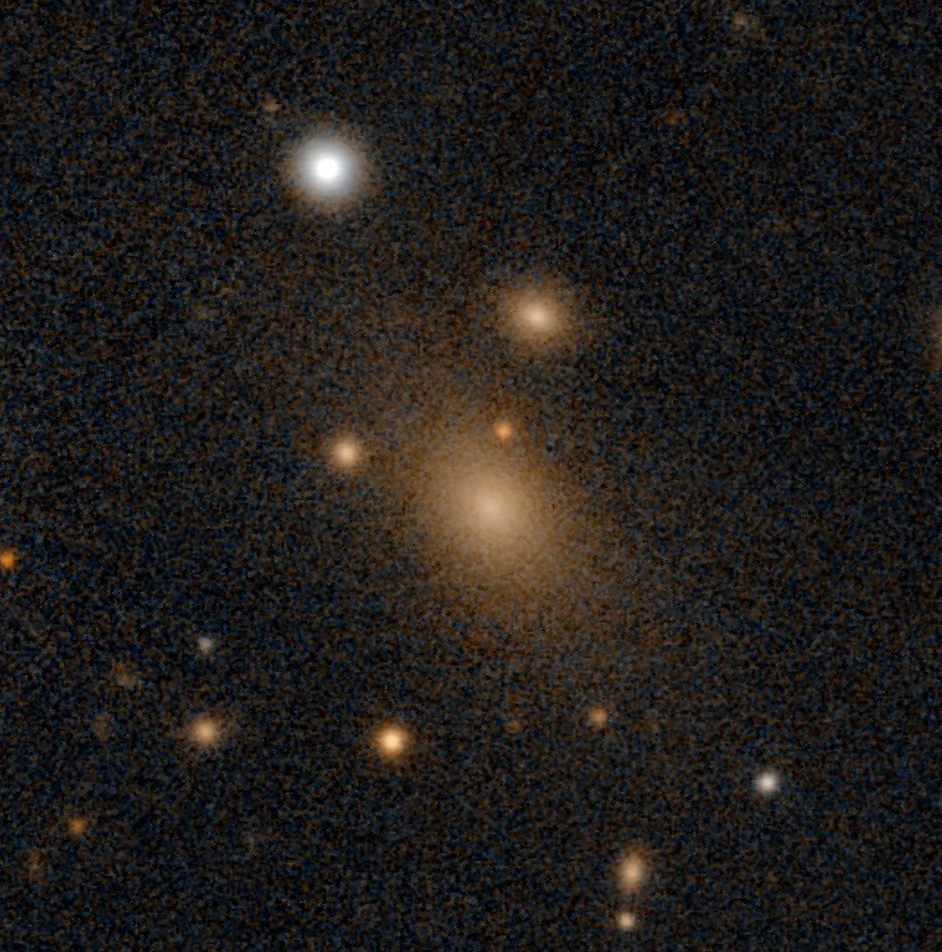
- Pan-STARRS image of Abell 478 BCG

Observation data (J2000.0 epoch)
- Constellation: Taurus
- Right ascension: 04^{h} 13^{m} 25.30^{s}
- Declination: +10° 27′ 54.49″
- Redshift: 0.086003
- Heliocentric radial velocity: 25,783 ± 100 km/s
- Distance: 1,239.4 ± 87.0 Mly (379.99 ± 26.68 Mpc)
- Group or cluster: Abell 478
- magnitude (J): 13.03
- magnitude (H): 11.65

Characteristics
- Type: BrCLG
- Size: ~560,000 ly (171.8 kpc) (estimated)

Other designations
- 2MASX J04132526+1027551, Abell 478:[ZAC2011] BCG, PGC 14685, NVSS J041325+102754, 2XMM J041325.2+102752

Abell 478 BCG (short for Abell 478 Brightest Cluster Galaxy) is a Type-cD galaxy located in the constellation of Taurus. The redshift of the galaxy is (z) 0.086 and it was first discovered from a 20 centimeter Very Large Array (VLA) study of Abell clusters in July 1993 and such, is categorized as a radio galaxy. It is the brightest cluster galaxy of the cool-core galaxy cluster Abell 478, shown dominating its center.

== Description ==
Abell 478 BCG is classified as a central dominant galaxy. The continuous star formation of the galaxy is estimated to be around 10 M_{☉} per year and the supermassive black hole lying in the center of the galaxy is found to be growing with a change rate of 1.6^{+1.2}_{−0.4} x 10^{−2} M_{☉} per year. The total bulge mass has been estimated as 28 ± 1 × 10^{11} M_{☉}.

The nucleus of Abell 478 BCG is shown as active with a presence of central radio source, described as point-like. The inner region of the core is found to contain four hotspot features with three located in the northern direction while the fourth is located in the southern direction. All the hotspots are estimated to be positioned between 30 and 60 kiloparsecs from each other. A radio observation has found two radio lobes, described as weak with an extend of four kiloparsecs in diameter and also pointing towards the directions of southwest and northeast. There is also detection of X-ray emission being double peaked on both eastern and western sides of its nucleus. The total radio flux of the source at 1.4 GHz frequencies, is estimated to be 30 mJy, with around 35% of the flux being contributed by the lobes. Evidence also found the presence of X-ray cavities, with radio plasma sweeping out the gas from it. The total cavity power is estimated to be 100.0^{+80.0}_{−20.0} × 10^{42} erg^{−1}. The radio core is found to have a flat radio spectrum with the total luminosity of 39.85 ± 0.03 at 5 GHz.

A study published in December 2001, has found detection of molecular gas in the galaxy. The total mass of the gas is estimated to be 4.5 ± 2.6 × 10^{9} M_{☉} and the mass outflow rate has been estimated to be 616 M_{☉} per year. The dust mass has been found to be approximately 1.0 × 10^{7} M_{☉}.
