= Abell 478 =

Galaxy cluster

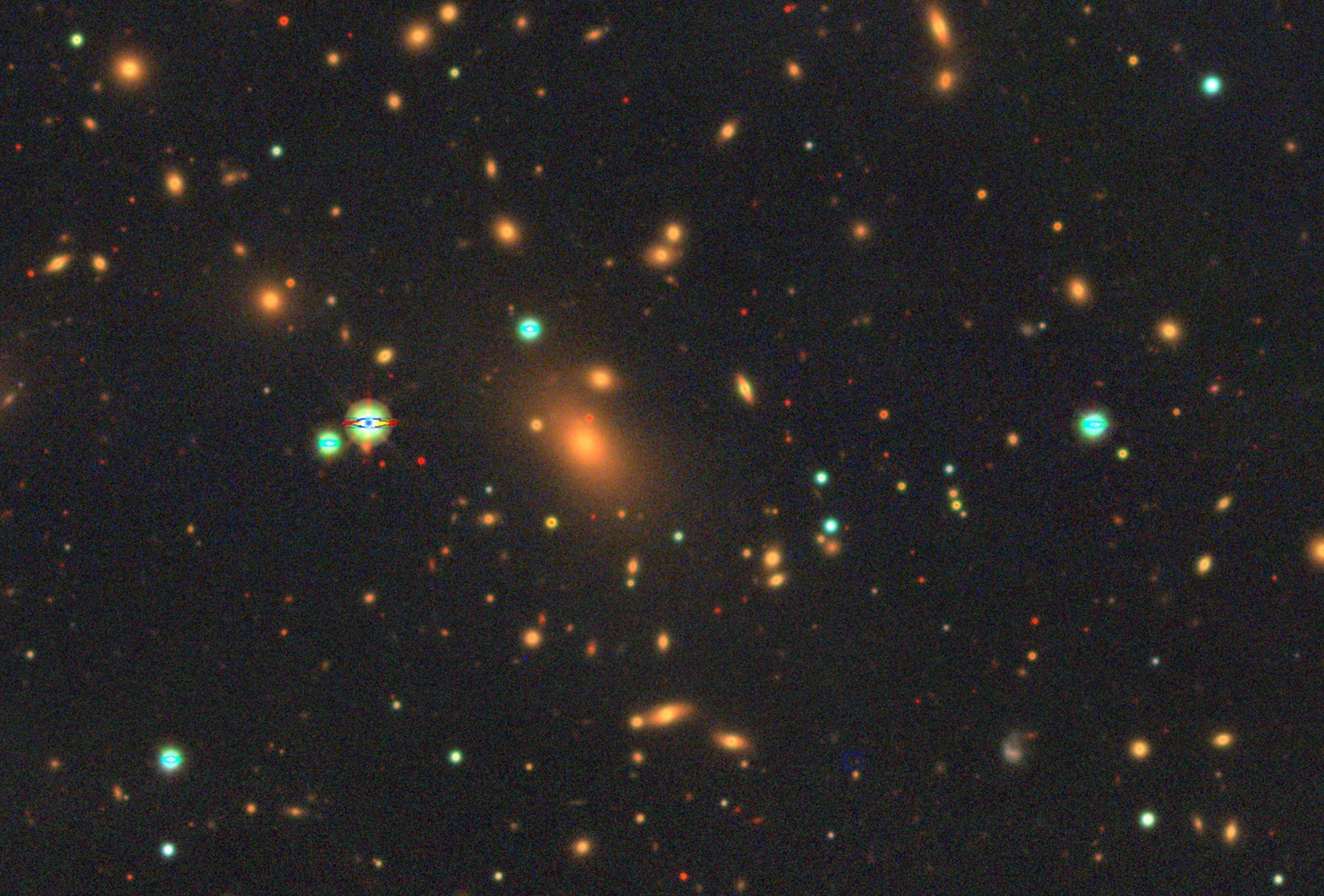
- Abell 478 seen by Legacy Surveys

Observation data (Epoch J2000)
- Constellation: Taurus
- Right ascension: 04^{h} 13^{m} 20.7^{s}
- Declination: +10° 28′ 35″
- Richness class: 2
- Redshift: 0.0881 (26 412 km/s)
- Distance: 367 Mpc (1,197 Mly) h^{−1}_{0.705}
- ICM temperature: 7.94 keV
- Binding mass: 7.68×10^{14} M_{☉}
- X-ray flux: (7.9 ± 1.1)×10^{−11} erg s^{−1} cm^{−2} (0.1–2.4 keV)

Other designations
- ZwCl 0410.8+1023; MCXC J0413.4+1028; SWIFT J0413.5+1027; XSS J04127+1029; RX J0413.4+1027; RXGCC 165

Abell 478 is an X-ray luminous galaxy cluster listed in the Abell catalogue. Abell 478 has a reasonably long exposure for 42.4 ksec by Chandra X-ray Observatory. A dusty quasar found in the background of Abell 478 that is detected by 15 m James Clerk Maxwell Telescope. The center of Abell 478 has a temperature of 2.46 keV, the outer regions has a temperature of 4.14 keV, indicating a cool flow core. Abell 478 has been deeply studied by X-ray observatories and satellites like EXOSAT, Einstein Observatory, ROSAT, Very Long Baseline Array, Chandra X-ray Observatory, XMM-Newton and Advanced Satellite for Cosmology and Astrophysics (ASCA), due to Abell 478 is considered one of the largest cooling flow cores, and there is two X-ray cavities detected.

== Properties ==
A study shows that Abell 478 is considered a dynamically relaxed galaxy cluster. Chandra X-ray Observatory found two X-ray cavities within central 15 MPC of Abell 478. These two cavities mainly caused by the past activities of the central supermassive black hole (SMBH). The current radio lobes are much smaller than the X-ray cavities, and the current radio strength is at least 10 times smaller than the minimum strength needed to create the X-ray cavities, indicating the central supermassive black hole of Abell 478 is significantly more active in the past.

Abell 478 is found to have one of the largest cooling flows ever observed, with cooling rate of ~1000 solar masses a year. A Marginal Carbon Monoxide (CO) Detection has been conducted, found that Abell 478 has an amount of Neutral Hydrogen (4.5 ± 2.2 × 10⁹ M☉), but not significant. Abell 478 has a X-ray morphology of near circular, has an ellipticity of 0.2. This supports the idea that Abell 478 is dynamically relaxed. A study of Dark matter have found that Abell 478 has cuspy dark matter profile with inner profile of n = 1, in agreement of the Cold Dark-Matter Model (CDM).

It is found that there is extra gas around the galaxy cluster that is absorbing the X-ray Gas, which is found that Abell 478 has an excess X-ray absorption (N_H) of ~4–5 × 10²¹ cm⁻². However, an analysis suggests that the excess gas that is absorbing the X-ray Gas is Galactic Origin, rather than Extragalactic origin. Another X-ray study found that the fact that Abell 478 is near circular is rejected, as Abell 478 is found to be significantly elliptical, from an analysis using the high resolution X-ray image from ROSAT. X-ray observations of Abell 478 found that Abell 478 is consistent with a hot, smooth, and dilute intracluster medium, centered on the central cD galaxy (PGC 14685).

Four hotspots are detected in the Intracluster Medium (ICM), with temperatures twice hotter than its surrounding gas. The excess energy detected in these hotspots is approximately 10 times the energy needed to create X-ray Cavities, suggesting that they are created by strong shocks of jets from the central Active Galactic Nuclei (AGN). The dark matter profile of Abell 478 is characterized of soft core, with a logarithmic slope of 0.35 ± 0.22. This is significantly flatter than the NFW profile (slope 1.0), but is consistent with other clusters containing a central dominating galaxy (cD galaxy), revealing that it is likely the cD galaxy of Abell 478 has modified the dark matter distribution. It is found that the jets and X-ray cavities in Abell 478 is not perfectly aligned, suggesting that the AGN activity has changed the direction overtime. This misalignment (ΔΨ) of 37.7° and 34.8° is not unique, and this pattern is seen in many other galaxy clusters such as Abell 2390 and Abell 496.

== See also ==
- Abell catalogue
- List of Abell clusters

== Gallery ==
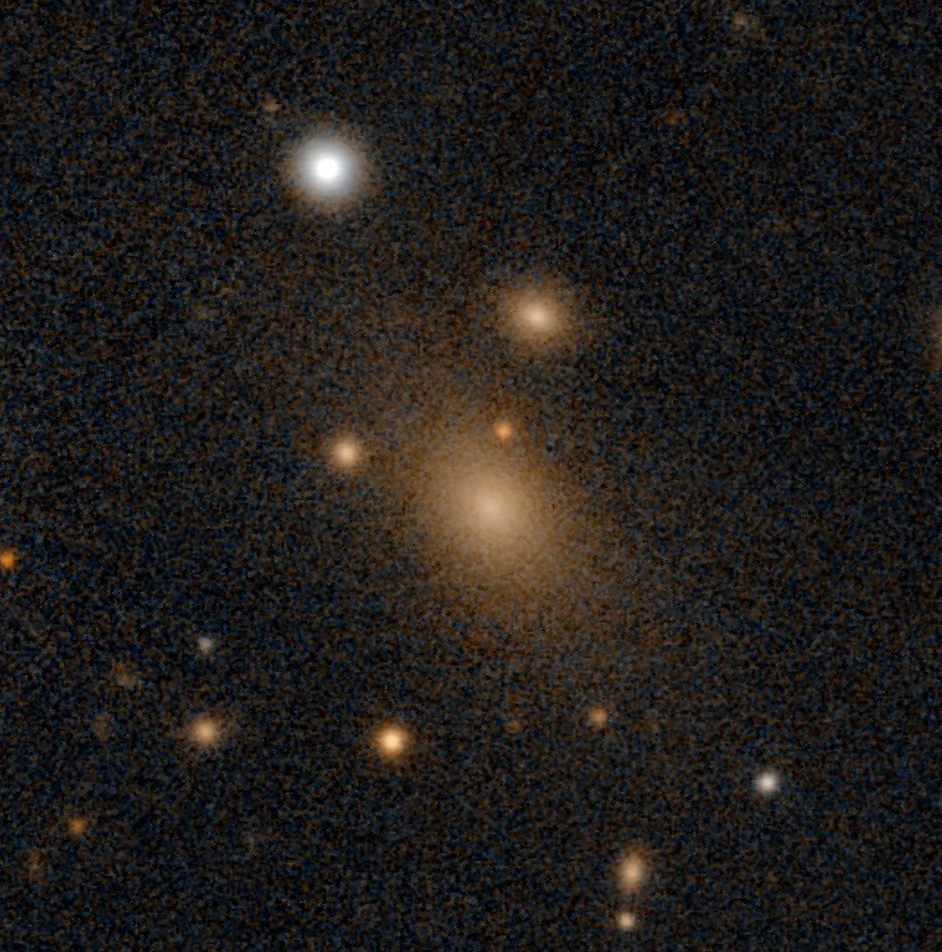
Abell 478's BCG

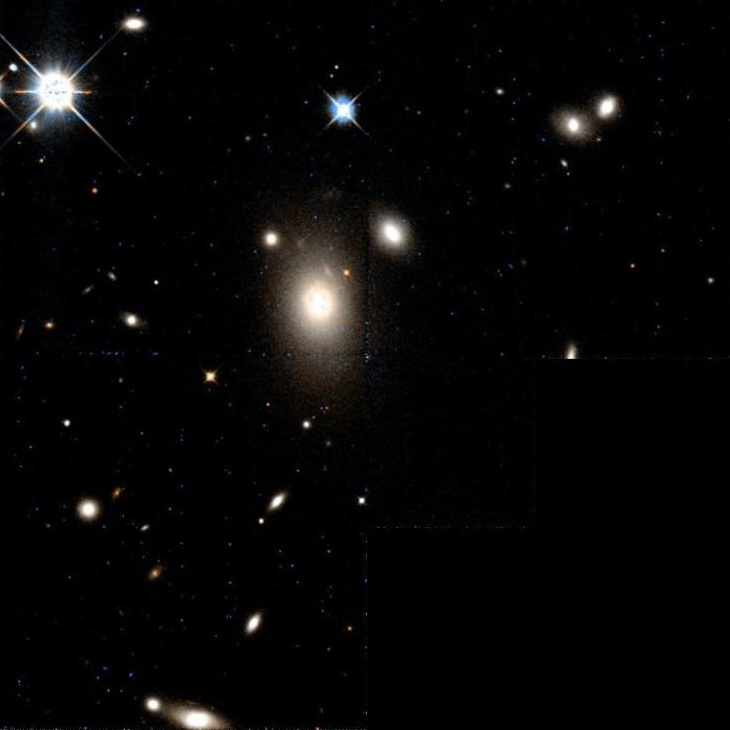
Abell 478

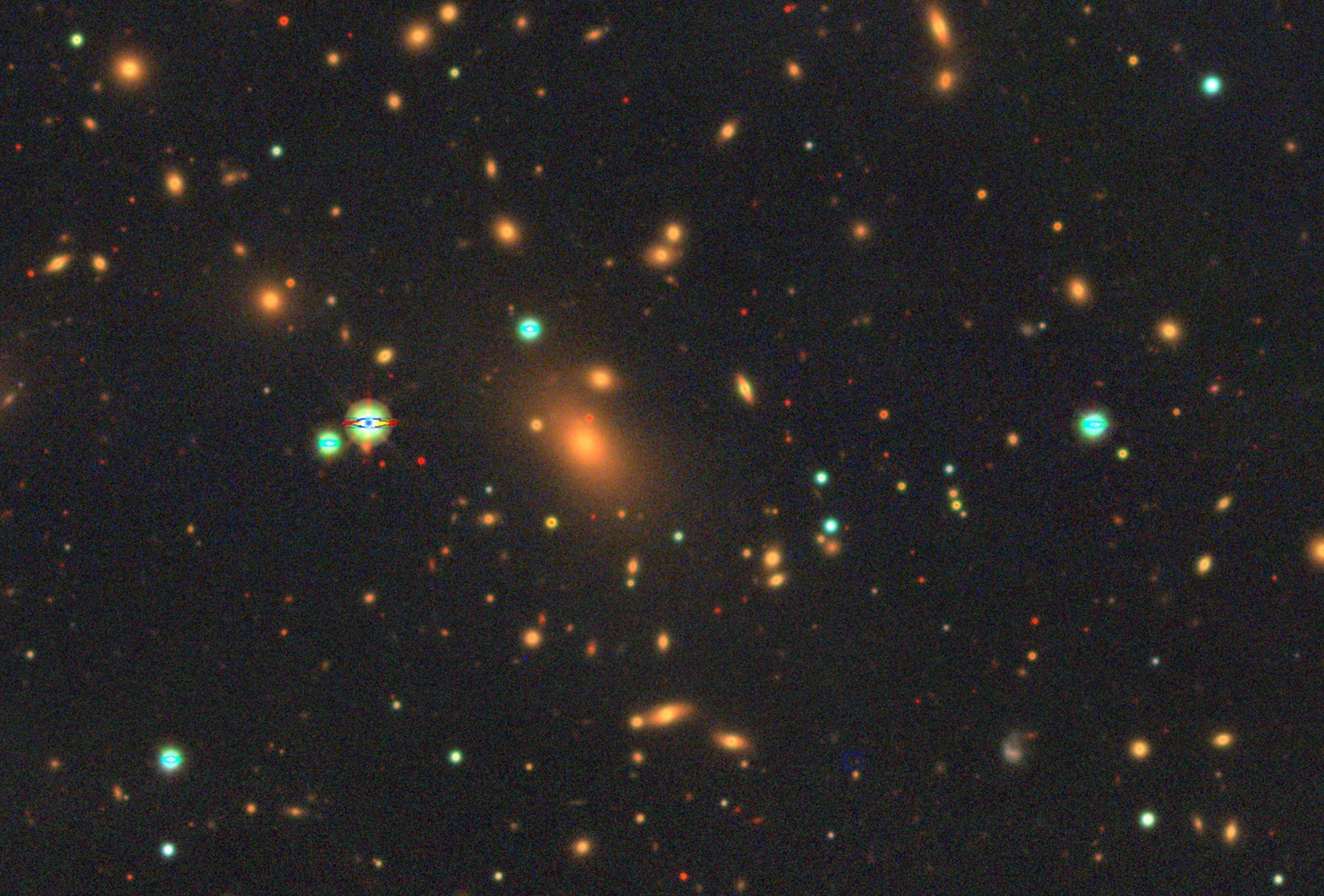
Abell 478 galaxy cluster seen by Legacy Surveys

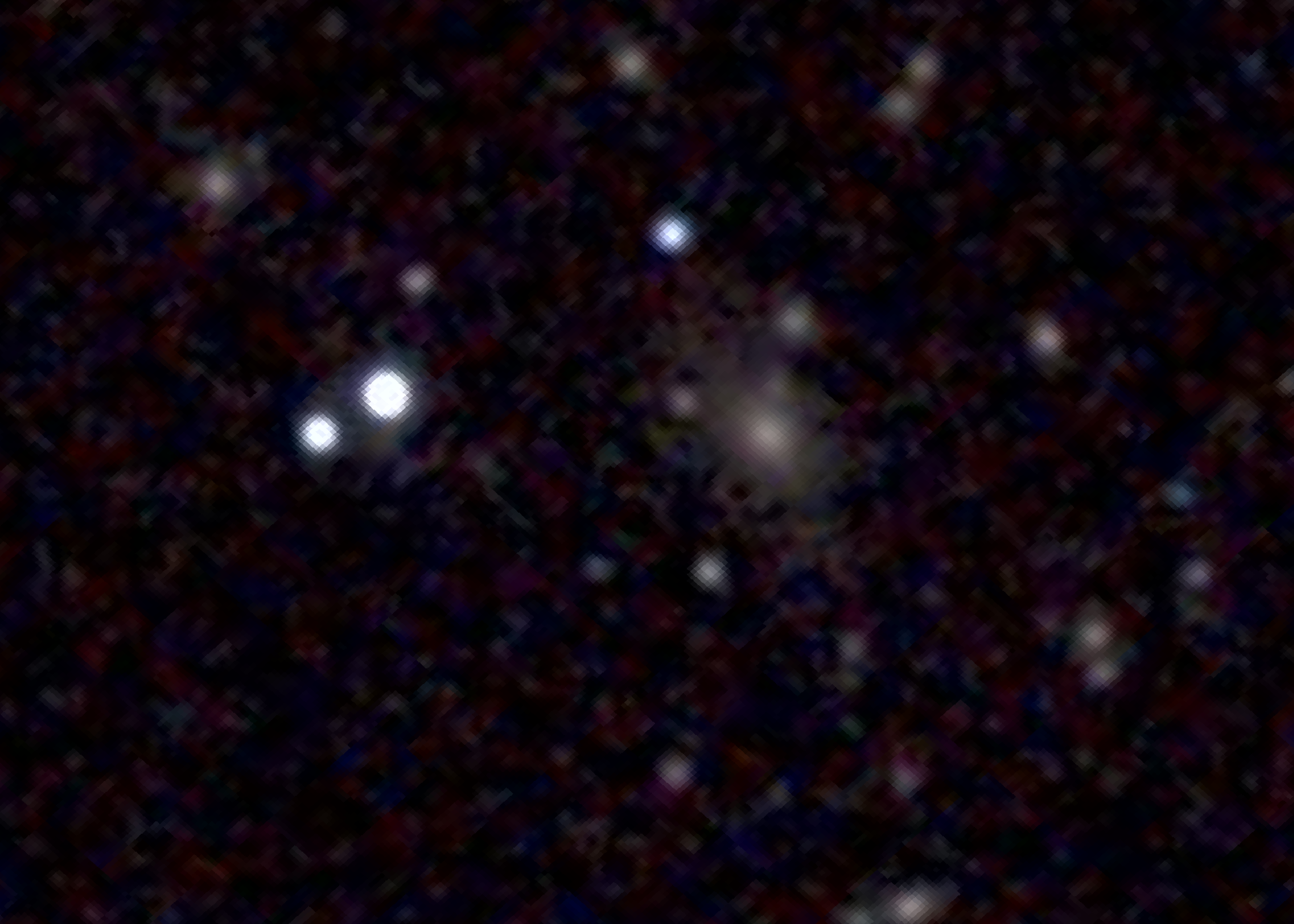
Abell 478 seen by 2MASS

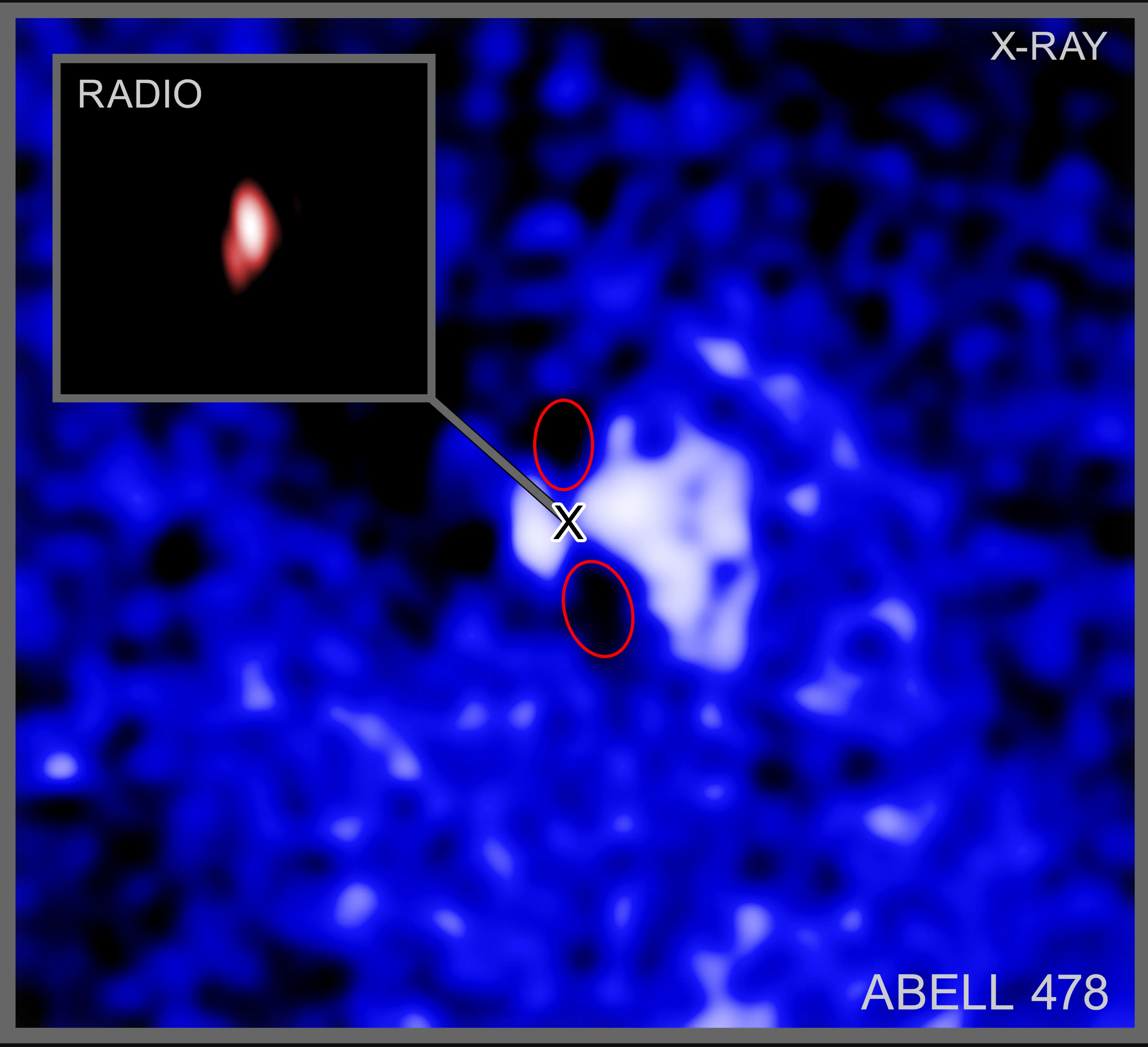
Hot gas emitted by 16 Supermassive black holes in Abell 478 that is detected by Chandra X-ray Observatory

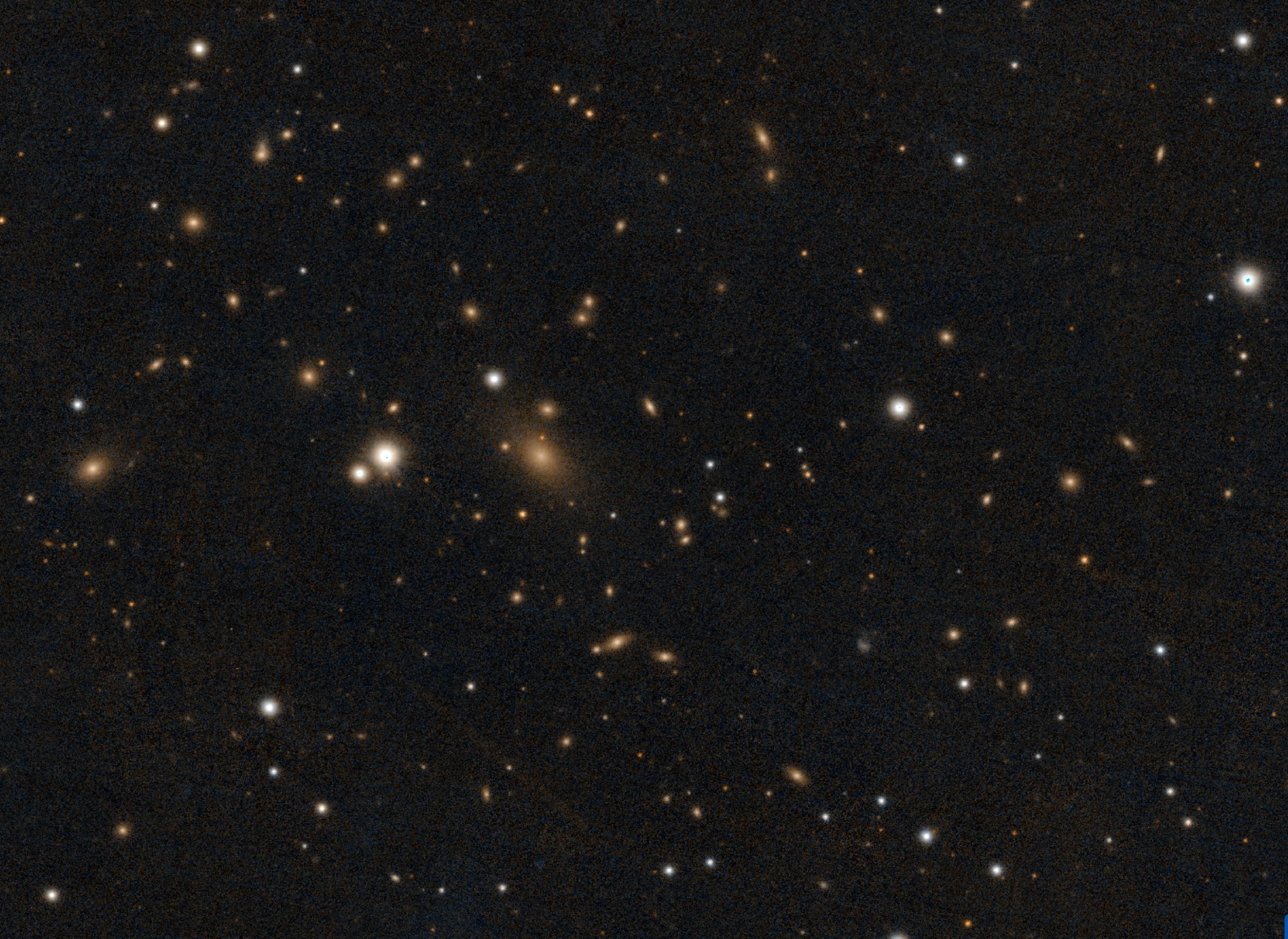
Abell 478 seen by Pan-STARRS

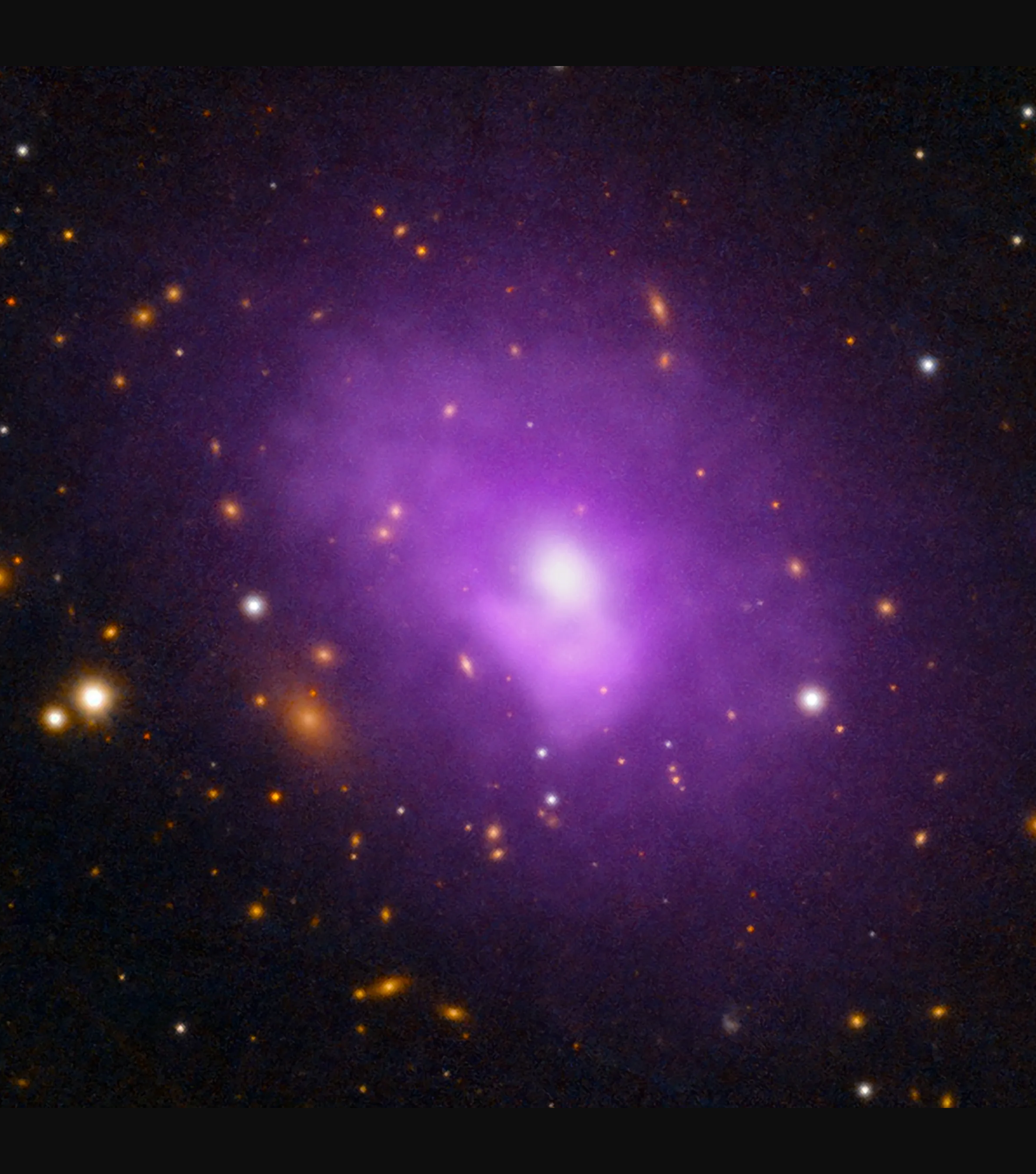
Hot gas in Abell 478 seen by Herschel Space Telescope
