= ESO 383-76 =

Galaxy in the constellation Centaurus

ESO 383-G 076
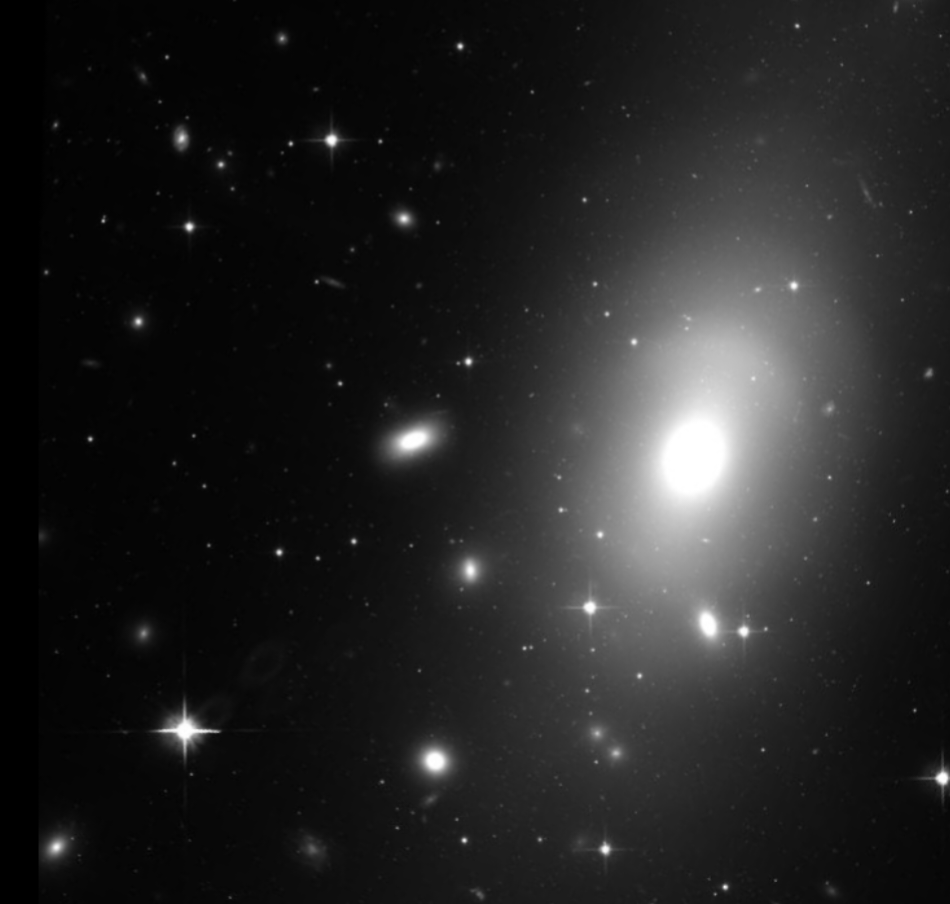
- Image of ESO 383-76 taken by the Hubble Space Telescope's Wide Field and Planetary Camera 2.

Observation data (J2000.0 epoch)
- Constellation: Centaurus
- Right ascension: 13^{h} 47^{m} 28.38^{s}
- Declination: −32° 51′ 53.9″
- Redshift: 0.03858±0.00003
- Heliocentric radial velocity: 11,567±9.3 km/s
- Galactocentric velocity: 11435±11 km/s
- Distance: 200.59 ± 14.12 megaparsecs (654.2 ± 46.05 million light-years)h^{−1}_{0.6774} (Note: The given distance in the overview of NED of 174.52 ± 12.22 megaparsecs (569.2 ± 39.86 million light-years) was based on an estimate using the Tully-Fischer relation. The distance estimate in this infobox was based on the galaxy's redshift.)
- Group or cluster: Abell 3571
- Apparent magnitude (V): 11.252

Characteristics
- Type: cD5; E5; BrClG
- Mass: 2.15×10^{12} M_{☉}
- Size: 540.9 kiloparsecs (1,800,000 light-years) (diameter; 90% total B-light); 136.9 kiloparsecs (447,000 light-years) (diameter; 25.0 mag/arcsec^{2} B-band isophote) (Note: The quick-look major axis physical diameter given by NED of 344.97 kiloparsecs (1,130,000 light-years) was based on an earlier distance estimate of 128 megaparsecs (417.5 million light-years). The quoted diameter in this infobox was based on NED's provided scale "Virgo + GA + Shapley" of 973 pc/arcsec multiplied with the given angular diameter of 555.90 arcsec.)
- Notable features: Supergiant elliptical galaxy; luminous X-ray source

Other designations
- ESO 383- G 076; ESO 134436-3237.0; AM 1344-323; MCG -05-33-002; WISEA J134728.38-325154.0; 2MASX J13472838-3251540; 2MASS J13472837-3251536; PGC 48896 Abell 3571 001; Abell 3571 BCG; Abell 3571 cD

ESO 383-76 (ESO 383-G 076) is an elongated, X-ray luminous supergiant elliptical galaxy, residing as the dominant, brightest cluster galaxy (BCG) of the Abell 3571 galaxy cluster, the sixth-brightest in the sky at X-ray wavelengths. It is located at the distance of 200.6 megaparsecs (654 million light-years) from Earth, and is possibly a member of the larger Shapley Supercluster. With a diameter of about 540.9 kiloparsecs (1.8 million light-years), it is one of the largest galaxies known. It also contains a supermassive black hole, one of the most massive known with mass of 27.5+46.6
−17.3 billion M_{☉} (10^{10.44 ± 0.43}) (with the range being 10.2 billion to 74.1 billion M_{☉}) based on the break radius of the galaxy central core.

== Observation history ==
The first known observation of the galaxy was during the creation of the Morphological Catalogue of Galaxies by Boris Vorontsov-Velyaminov and V.P. Harkipova in 1974, with the catalogue entry MCG-05-33-002. The galaxy was also observed around this time by the ESO Sky Survey Atlas, a large-scale survey of the Southern Sky conducted using the 1-metre Schmidt telescope in La Silla Observatory. In 1982, the ESO/Uppsala Catalogue then lists the galaxy in its current designation form – ESO 383-G 076, indicating both its field number (field 383 out of the 606 in the survey), classification (G, for "Galaxy"), and its numerical identifier in its field. The galaxy, at this point, was nothing more than just an obscure catalogue entry.

O.G. Richter in 1984 then observed the galaxy during a redshift survey of the ESO/SRC Survey Fields 444 and 445 of the Klemola 27 group (now known as the IC 4329 galaxy group). The group consists of prominent galaxies such as the namesake IC 4329 – another massive supergiant elliptical that is also an extreme Seyfert galaxy, and NGC 5291 – a disturbed interacting galaxy pair. ESO 383-76, initially thought to be a member of this group, was listed as the 442nd galaxy in Richter's table entry and has been given the morphology E/S0 (either an elliptical or lenticular galaxy). The galaxy has also been included in the Southern Galaxy Catalogue, containing nearly 5,000 galaxies, compiled in 1985 by the husband-and-wife astrophysicists Gérard and Antoinette de Vaucouleurs, along with H.G. Corwin Jr.

ESO 383-76 would be additionally recorded in many subsequent galaxy surveys, such as the survey of the Hydra–Centaurus Supercluster by L.N. da Costa et al in 1986, and moreover a photometric catalogue by Lauberts and Valentijn in 1989 that made the first angular diameter measurements of the galaxy. This includes the D_{25} and D_{25.5} B-band isophotes, as well as the 50% total light emission (the half-light radius) and variations of it (60%, 70%, and 90%). A.P. Fairall et al would further incorporate the galaxy in their wide-scale survey of the Hydra-Centaurus Supercluster in 1989. It was additionally included in many other surveys due to its location in the sky in the rich Centaurus region and the wide-scale research of extragalactic objects near the Milky Way plane by the last decade of the 20th century. The galaxy has additionally been catalogued by Alan Dressler in 1991 during an analysis of velocities of 1,314 galaxies near the Milky Way galactic plane region – allowing to pinpoint the location and verify the existence of the Great Attractor.

== Description ==
ESO 383-76 is a supergiant elliptical galaxy (type-cD galaxy) of an advanced Hubble morphology (E5, with E0 being spherical and E7 being flattened), with its major axis being more than twice the length of its minor axis. The galaxy is a very luminous source of X-rays, and is the sixth-brightest X-ray source in the sky.

In an analysis of the cluster A3571 by H. Quintana and R. de Souza in 1994, ESO 383-76 has been noted to have a very elongated shape with a diffuse halo extending throughout the cluster, suggesting that the galaxy had formed very early during the formation of Abell 3571 and it retains the original imprint of its collapsing cloud. The mass of the core region, which also includes the galaxy, is on the order of 2.15×10^{12} M_{☉}.

== Size ==
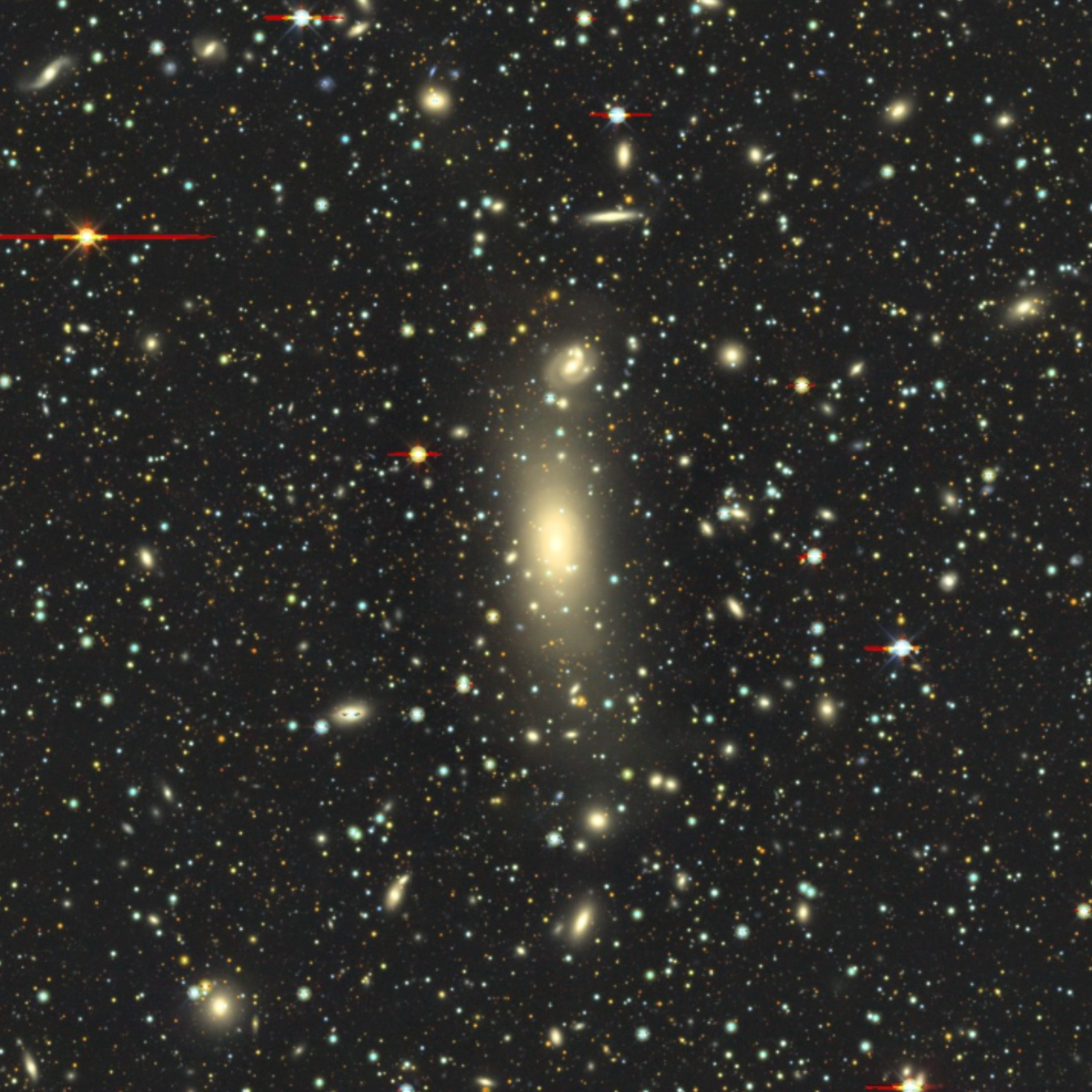
ESO 383-76 imaged by the DESI Legacy Imaging Surveys, Data Release 10.

There are various methods used in astronomy in defining the size of a galaxy, and each of them can yield different results with respect to the other. This is usually affected by exposure time, the wavelength used, and the instrument being used.

One method that is commonly used in the astronomical literature is the galaxy effective radius where 50% of the total galaxy's light was emitted; variations of 60%, 70%, and 90% are also used. An estimation of the galaxy's size by the ESO/Uppsala catalogue's broad-band photographic plates in 1989 using the 90% total light definition yield a very large apparent diameter of 555.9 arcseconds (about 9.25 arcminutes; 27% the width of the full moon in the sky), which using the currently accepted distance to the galaxy yield a diameter of 540.9 kiloparsecs (1,800,000 light-years). This makes it one of the largest physical diameter measurements of any galaxy known – 20 times that of the Milky Way's diameter, and 3.5 times that of the maximum estimated diameter of IC 1101.

Alternative measurements from the same study using other methods (such as the D_{25} isophote) yield diameters as small as 139.04 kiloparsecs (453,000 light-years), with various estimates in between depending on the measurement. In a study in 1994, the halo of the galaxy (defined as the brightness at 2σ above background) has a diameter of about 600 kiloparsecs (2 million light-years). The paper states that this is on the scale of the distance between the Milky Way and Andromeda galaxies. The halo extends throughout a large part of Abell 3571.

== Environment ==
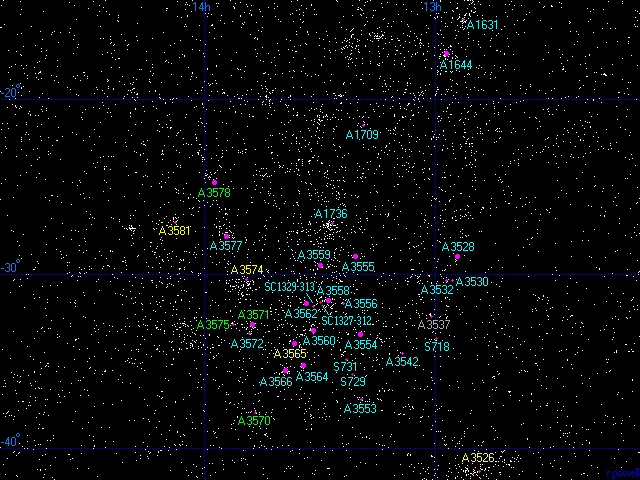
A map of the Shapley Supercluster region, showing Abell 3571 (labelled A3571 in green) relative to it.

ESO 383-76 lies at the center of the Abell 3571 galaxy cluster, which is a possible member of the Shapley Supercluster (or alternatively the Shapley 8 Concentration – an outlying structure). This massive supercluster hosts many clusters with similar supergiant elliptical galaxies, among them ESO 444-46.

== See also ==
- Messier 87
- ESO 306-17
- NeVe 1
