= ESO 444-46 =

Galaxy in the constellation Centaurus

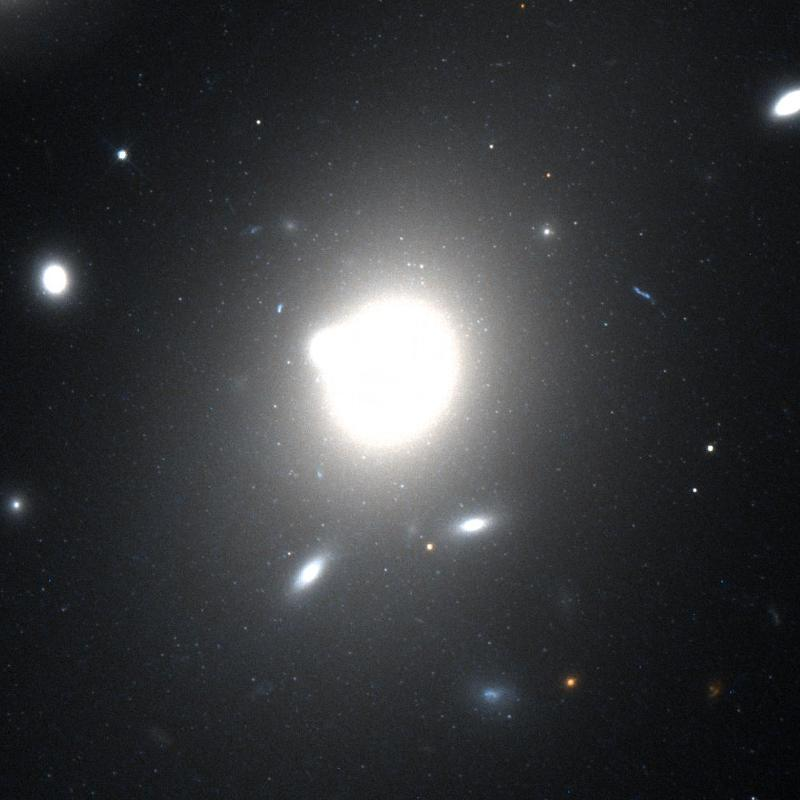
- HST image of the elliptical galaxy ESO 444-46.

Observation data (J2000 epoch)
- Constellation: Centaurus
- Right ascension: 13^{h} 27^{m} 56.9s^{s}
- Declination: −31° 29′ 44″
- Redshift: 0.046902±0.000070
- Heliocentric radial velocity: 14,061±21 km/s
- Galactocentric velocity: 13,921±22 km/s
- Distance: 654.9 ± 45.99 Mly (200.8 ± 14.1 Mpc)h^{−1}_{0.6774} (Comoving); 667 Mly (204.5 Mpc)h^{−1}_{0.6774} (Light-travel)
- Group or cluster: Abell 3558
- Apparent magnitude (V): 12.6

Characteristics
- Type: cD;E+4;BrClG
- Size: 670,710 ly × 382,320 ly (205.64 kpc × 117.22 kpc) (diameter; 27.0 B-mag arcsec^{−2}) (Note: The quick-look major axis physical diameters given by NED of 183.41 by 104.55 kiloparsecs (598,000 by 341,000 light-years) and 123.32 by 86.32 kiloparsecs (402,000 by 282,000 light-years) were based on a distance estimate of 179.0 ± 45.255 megaparsecs (583.8 ± 147.6 million light-years). The quoted diameters in this infobox were based on NED's provided scale "Virgo + GA + Shapley" of 973 parsecs/arcsec multiplied by the given angular diameters.); 450,940 ly × 315,650 ly (138.26 kpc × 96.78 kpc) (diameter; "total" magnitude)
- Apparent size (V): 1.7′ × 1.2′
- Notable features: Large globular cluster population

Other designations
- ESO 444- G 046, Shapley 8-1, MCG −05-32-026, PGC 047202

ESO 444-46 (Shapley 8-1, A3558-M1 or ESO 444-G 046) is a class E4 supergiant elliptical galaxy; the dominant and brightest member of the Abell 3558 galaxy cluster around 200.8 ± 14.1 megaparsecs (654.9 ± 45.99 million light-years) away in the constellation Centaurus. It lies within the core of the massive Shapley Supercluster (Shapley Concentration), one of the closest neighboring superclusters. It is one of the largest galaxies in the local universe, and possibly contains one of the most massive black holes known. The black hole's mass is very uncertain of 26.9 billion solar masses (M_{☉}), (with estimates ranging from as low as 501 million M_{☉}, to as high as 77.6 billion M_{☉}) based on the break radius of the host galaxy.

== Physical characteristics ==
=== Globular clusters ===
ESO 444-46 has an estimated population of about 27,000 globular clusters which may be one of the largest populations ever studied. This is in contrast to 15,000 globular clusters in Messier 87 (M87), and 200 in the Milky Way. However, this large number may be due to the addition of Intracluster globular clusters since the galaxy lies about 1 arcmin of the center of Abell 3558.

=== Supermassive black hole ===
A calculation using the spheroidal luminosity method by estimating the stellar density of the central region using its brightness, yielded an initial mass of 77.6 ^{+191.5}_{−55.2} billion M_{☉} (with the range being 22.4 billion M_{☉} to 269.1 billion M_{☉}), and current mass of 83.2 ^{+205.2}_{−59.2} billion M_{☉} (with the range being 24 billion M_{☉} to 288.4 billion M_{☉}). This would make it one of the most massive black holes known – nearly twelve times the mass of the black hole in Messier 87 (M87*), and 18,000 times more massive than Sagittarius A* (Sgr A*), the Milky Way's central black hole. A black hole of this mass has a Schwarzschild radius of 1,531 (with the range being 868.6 to 10,660) AU (about 458 billion km (with the range being 130 billion km to 1.59 trillion km) in diameter) or 102 (with the range being 28.8 to 354.8) times the distance between Neptune and the Sun.

Alternative calculations using the M-sigma relation and the newer core break radius method yielded estimates of 501+787
−306 million M_{☉} and 26.9+47.2
−17.1 billion M_{☉}, respectively.

== See also ==
- List of galaxies
- List of nearest galaxies
- List of NGC objects (4001–5000)
- List of spiral galaxies
- NGC 4889
- NGC 4874
- IC 1101
- ESO 383-76
