= NGC 4246 =

Galaxy in the constellation Virgo

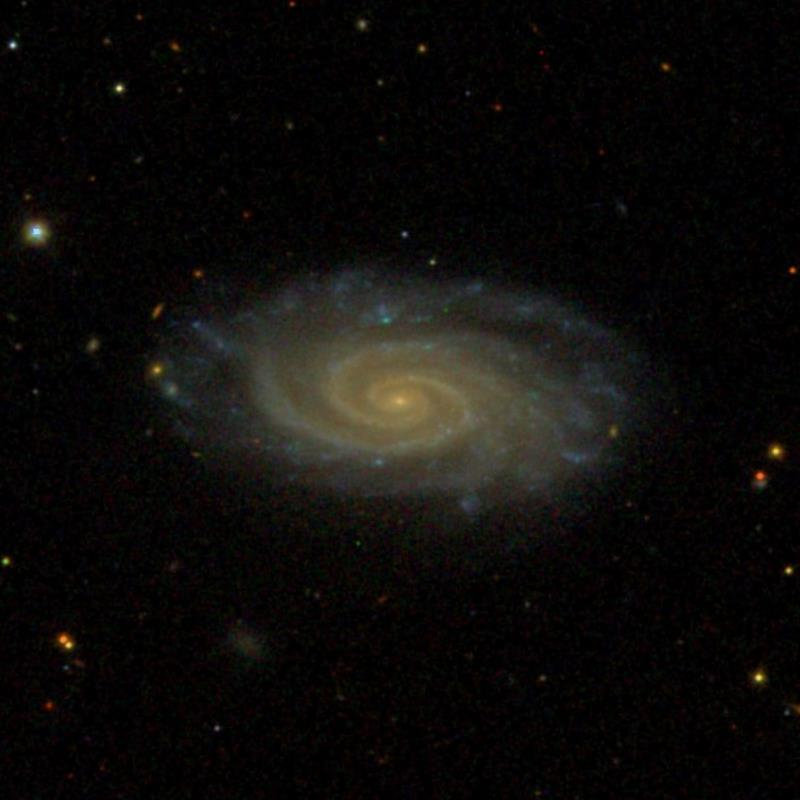
- Spiral galaxy NGC 4246

Observation data (J2000 epoch)
- Constellation: Virgo
- Right ascension: 12^{h} 17^{m} 58.1131^{s}
- Declination: +07° 11′ 09.376″
- Redshift: 0.012405
- Heliocentric radial velocity: 3719 ± 2 km/s
- Distance: 172.01 ± 10.57 Mly (52.74 ± 3.241 Mpc)
- Apparent magnitude (V): 12.7

Characteristics
- Type: SA(s)c
- Size: ~133,600 ly (40.97 kpc) (estimated)
- Apparent size (V): 2.3′ × 1.2′

Other designations
- HOLM 359B, 2MASX J12175811+0711091, IC 3113, UGC 7334, MCG +01-31-041, PGC 39479, CGCG 041-070

NGC 4246 is an unbarred spiral galaxy in the constellation of Virgo. Its velocity with respect to the cosmic microwave background is 4064 ± 24 km/s, which corresponds to a Hubble distance of 195.5 ± 13.7 Mly (59.94 ± 4.21 Mpc). However, 20 non-redshift measurements give a distance of 172.01 ± 10.57 Mly (52.740 ± 3.241 Mpc). It was discovered by German-British astronomer William Herschel on 13 April 1784. It was also observed by German astronomer Arnold Schwassmann on 30 October 1899 and listed in the Index Catalogue as IC 3113.

According to the SIMBAD database, NGC 4246 is a LINER galaxy, i.e. a galaxy whose nucleus has an emission spectrum characterized by broad lines of weakly ionized atoms.

NGC 4246 along with NGC 4235 and NGC 4247 are listed together as Holm 359 in Erik Holmberg's A Study of Double and Multiple Galaxies Together with Inquiries into some General Metagalactic Problems, published in 1937.

== Supernovae ==
Two supernovae have been observed in NGC 4246:

- SN 1975C (type unknown, mag. 18) was discovered by American astronomer Charles Kowal on 15 March 1975.
- SN 1984U (type unknown, mag. 18) was discovered by L. E. Gonzalez at the Cerro El Roble Observatory on 2 March 1984.

== See also ==
- List of NGC objects (4001–5000)
