= MS 1455.0+2232 BCG =

Type-cD galaxy in the constellation Boötes

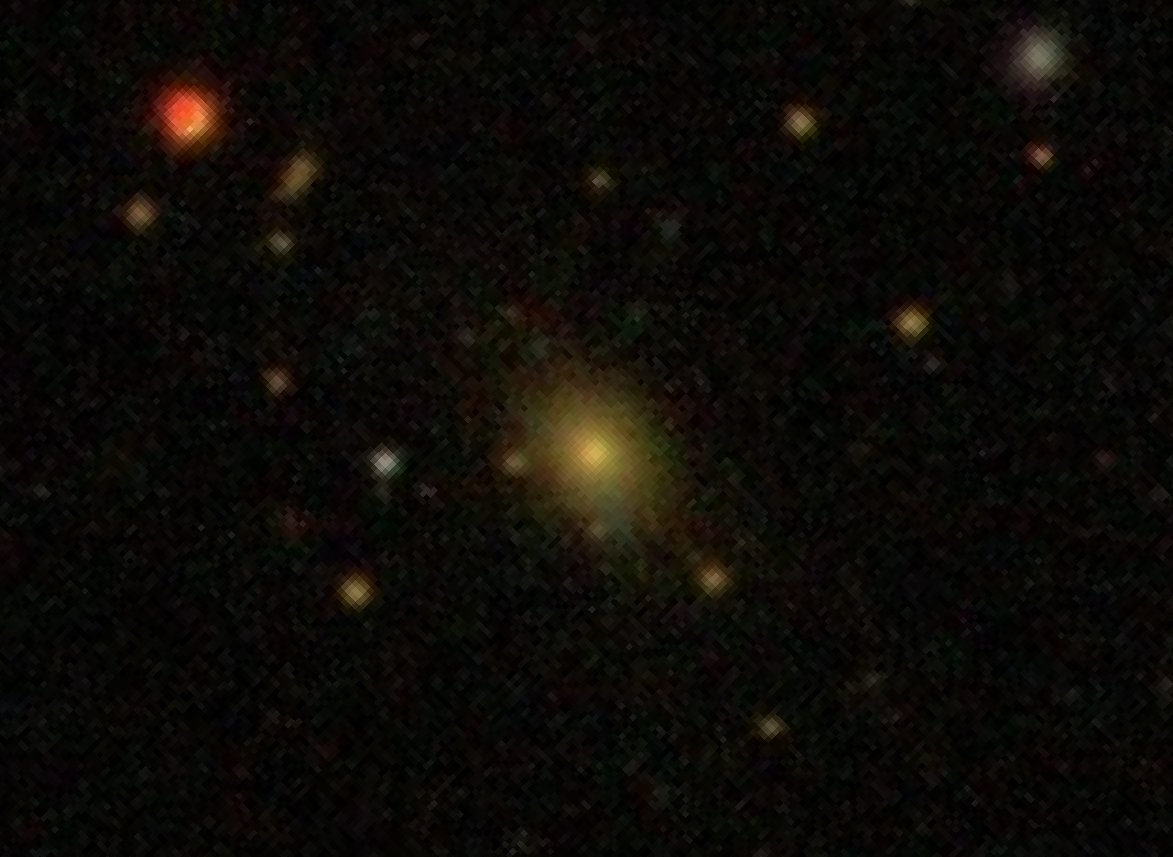
- SDSS image of MS 1455.0+2232 BCG

Observation data (J2000.0 epoch)
- Constellation: Boötes
- Right ascension: 14^{h} 57^{m} 15.08^{s}
- Declination: +22° 20′ 34.29″
- Redshift: 0.257620
- Heliocentric radial velocity: 77,233 km/s ± 0
- Distance: 3.736 Gly (1145.56 Mpc)
- Group or cluster: MS 1455.0+2232
- magnitude (J): 14.71

Characteristics
- Type: BrClG
- Size: ~618,000 ly (189.4 kpc) (estimated)

Other designations
- RX J1457.3+2220, LEDA 1668167, NVSS J145715+222036, SDSS J145715.10+222034.4, 2MASX J14571507+2220341

MS 1455.0+2232 BCG (short for MS 1455.0+2232 Brightest Cluster Galaxy), is a massive type-cD galaxy located in the constellation of Boötes. The redshift of the galaxy is (z) 0.257 and it was first discovered as an astronomical radio source by astronomers in April 1998. It is the brightest cluster galaxy of the galaxy cluster MS 1455.0+2232.

== Description ==
MS 1455.0+2232 BCG is classified as a central cluster galaxy (CCG) of MS 1455.0+2232. Its optical spectrum is found to display emission lines that are categorized as both strong and narrow with a full width at half maximum of 500 kilometers per seconds. It also contains a blue continuum that is found to be enhanced. The K-band magnitude of the BCG is estimated to be around 13.91. It is also found to contain detections of molecular gas with an estimated mass of 6.1 ± 2.4 × 10^{10} M_{☉} and also undergoing molecular gas outflows at the rate of around 1,227 M_{☉} per year. The central core of the BCG is described to have a blue appearance. Its total star formation rate is around 36 ± 4 M_{☉} per year based on an ultraviolet excess technique. The appearance of the galaxy is categorized as boxy.

The nucleus of MS 1455.0+2232 BCG is found to be active and it has been classified as a radio galaxy. There is a compact radio source associated with it and described as point-like. When observed, the source is found to contain a central compact component that is surrounded by a halo that is depicted as extended. The radio core of the BCG remains unresolved although the source is further separated into several components; mainly a western component that is misaligned slightly with the galaxy and another component that has an eastern extension. The total flux density of the compact component is estimated as 11.93 ± 1.24 mJy.

Young blue stellar populations have also been detected in the BCG, indicating a recent history of moderate star formations. Two stellar components are found located in the inner region with the mean ages estimated as 3440 ± 680 million years.
