= Holmberg 15A =

Galaxy in the constellation Cetus

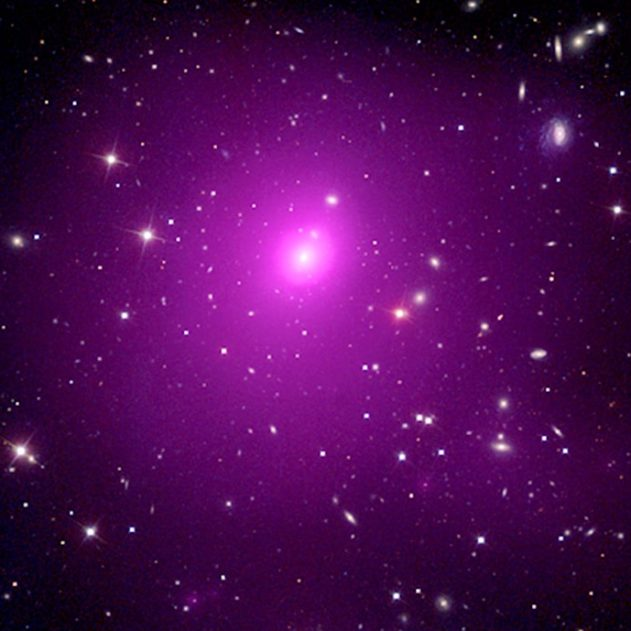
- Holmberg 15A (in the center) in X-rays by Chandra X-ray Observatory

Observation data (J2000.0 epoch)
- Constellation: Cetus
- Right ascension: 00^{h} 41^{m} 50.5^{s}
- Declination: −09° 18′ 11″
- Redshift: 0.055359±0.000016
- Heliocentric radial velocity: 16,596±5 km/s
- Galactocentric velocity: 16,653±5 km/s
- Distance: 787.3 ± 55.12 Mly (241.4 ± 16.9 Mpc)h^{−1}_{0.6774} (Comoving); 753 Mly (230.9 Mpc)h^{−1}_{0.6774} (Light-travel)
- Group or cluster: Abell 85
- Apparent magnitude (V): 14.7

Characteristics
- Type: cD;BrClG
- Mass: 7×10^{13} M_{☉}
- Number of stars: 5×10^{12}
- Size: 390,570 ly × 218,720 ly (119.75 kpc × 67.06 kpc) (diameter; 25.0 B-mag arcsec^{−2}) (Note: The quick-look major axis physical diameters given by NED of 106.19 by 59.47 kiloparsecs (346,000 by 194,000 light-years) and 105.00 by 81.90 kiloparsecs (342,000 by 267,000 light-years) were based on a distance estimate of 214.000 ± 45.016 megaparsecs (698.0 ± 146.8 million light-years). The quoted diameters in this infobox were based on NED's provided scale "Virgo + GA + Shapley" of 1.17 kpc/arcsec multiplied by the given angular diameters.); 386,170 ly × 301,240 ly (118.40 kpc × 92.36 kpc) (diameter; "total" magnitude)
- Apparent size (V): 1.3′ × 1.2′

Other designations
- Abell 85-BCG, PGC 2501

Holmberg 15A (abbreviated to Holm 15A) is a supergiant elliptical galaxy and the brightest galaxy of the Abell 85 galaxy cluster in the constellation Cetus, about 241.4 megaparsecs (787.3 million light-years) from Earth. It was discovered c. 1937 by Erik Holmberg. It became well known when it was reported to have the largest core ever observed in a galaxy, spanning some 15,000 light years, however this was subsequently refuted.

== Supermassive black hole ==
It has been postulated that the primary component of the galactic core is a supermassive black hole with a mass of 40 ± 8 billion solar masses (M_{☉}), although no direct measurement has yet been made. Previous estimates by Lauer et al. have jointed a mass value as high as 310 billion M_{☉} using the gamma ray point break radius method. Kormendy and Bender gave a value of 260 billion M_{☉} in a 2009 paper. Lower estimates were given by Kormendy and Ho et al. in 2013 at 2.1 and 9.2 billion M_{☉}. The paper by Lopez-Cruz et al. stated: "Therefore, we conservatively suggest that Holm 15A hosts an SMBH with a mass of 10^{10} M_{☉}." Kormendy and Ho et al derived these equations using the M–sigma relation and the size of the outer bulge of the galaxy, which are indirect estimates. Rusli et al derived a value of 170 billion M_{☉} using break radius methodology. In addition, Abell 85 has its velocity dispersion of dark matter halo at ~750 km/s, which could be explained only by a black hole with a mass greater than 150 billion M_{☉}, although Kormendy and Ho et al stated that "dark matter halos are scale-free, and the SMBH-dark matter coevolution is independent from the effects of baryons". This makes it one of the most massive black holes ever discovered, with it being classified as an ultramassive black hole.

== See also ==
- List of galaxies
