= NGC 4658 =

Spiral galaxy in the constellation Virgo

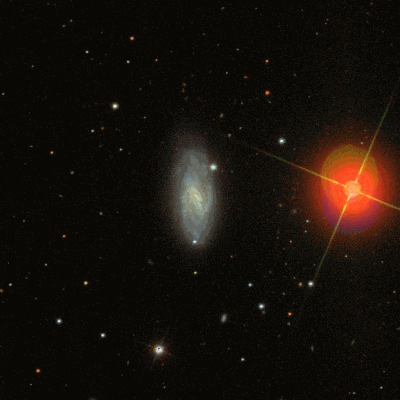

Observation data (J2000 epoch)
- Constellation: Virgo
- Right ascension: 12^{h} 44^{m} 37.8^{s}
- Declination: −10° 4′ 56″
- Redshift: 0.007966
- Distance: 95.37 Mly; 29.24 Mpc
- Apparent magnitude (V): 12.1
- Magnitude (J): 13.198
- Magnitude (H): 10.072
- Magnitude (K): 9.822

Characteristics
- Type: Sc III, SBc
- Apparent size (V): 2.1' x 0.9'

Other designations
- MCG-02-33-001, PGC 42929, LEDA 42929

NGC 4658 is a spiral galaxy located in the constellation of Virgo. It was discovered by William Herschel on March 25, 1786.

NGC 4658 is part of a galaxy group known as NGC 4658 Group or LGG 304, it has at least 6 confirmed members, which are NGC 4682, NGC 4680, NGC 4658, MCG 2-33-20, MCG 1-33-32 and MCG 2-33-10.
