= 3C 401 =

Radio galaxy in the constellation Draco

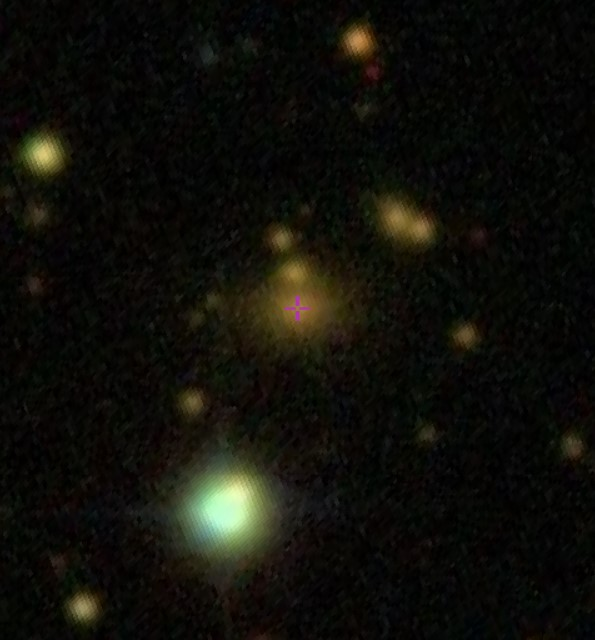
- 3C 401 captured by SDSS

Observation data (J2000 epoch)
- Constellation: Draco
- Right ascension: 19^{h} 40^{m} 25.1^{s}
- Declination: +60° 41′ 35″
- Redshift: 0.201100
- Distance: 2.348 billion light-years (720 megaparsecs)h^{−1}_{0.73}
- Apparent magnitude (V): 17.13

Characteristics
- Type: G, FR II

Other designations
- LEDA 2605547, 3C 401, 4C 60.29, 6C 193938+603431, 8C 1939+605

3C 401 is a powerful radio galaxy located in the constellation Draco. It is near the center of a rich cluster of galaxies and dominates the cluster. That is, it is the type-cD galaxy of its cluster. It has a double nucleus, indicating that it is merging with another galaxy.

3C 401 is classified as a Fanaroff and Riley class II radio source (FR II), but has characteristics of both types of sources. FR II radio sources are brightest at the ends of their radio lobes while FR I sources are brightest toward their centers. 3C 401 has hot spots at the ends of its two extended radio lobes, but also has a bright one-sided jet like a FR I source. The spectra of this jet is also intermediate between the spectra of jets in the two types of sources.
