= NGC 4708 =

Galaxy in the constellation Virgo

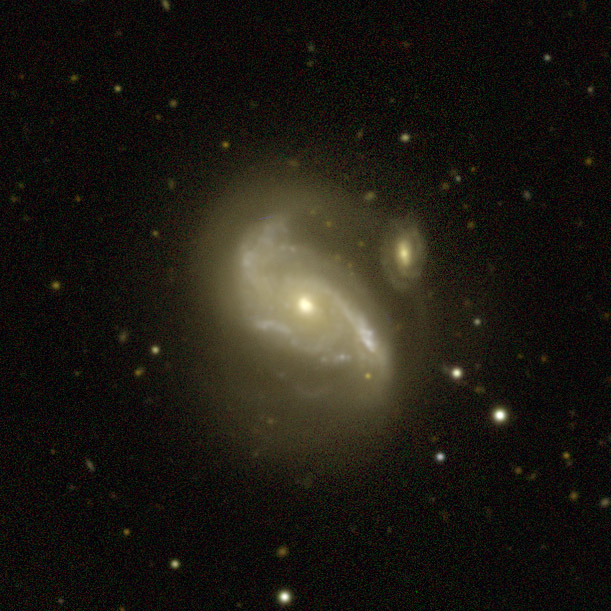
- NGC 4708 imaged by Legacy Surveys

Observation data (J2000 epoch)
- Constellation: Virgo
- Right ascension: 12^{h} 49^{m} 41.4813^{s}
- Declination: −11° 05′ 34.679″
- Redshift: 0.013900±0.0000270
- Heliocentric radial velocity: 4,167±8 km/s
- Distance: 204.76 ± 19.97 Mly (62.780 ± 6.122 Mpc)
- Group or cluster: Holm 463
- Apparent magnitude (V): 13.1

Characteristics
- Type: SA(r)ab pec
- Size: ~118,100 ly (36.22 kpc) (estimated)
- Apparent size (V): 1.2′ × 0.9′

Other designations
- HOLM 463A, IRAS 12470-1049, 2MASX J12494148-1105350, MCG -02-33-016, PGC 43382

NGC 4708 is a peculiar spiral galaxy in the constellation of Virgo. Its velocity with respect to the cosmic microwave background is 4,505±25 km/s, which corresponds to a Hubble distance of 216.7 ± 15.2 Mly (66.44 ± 4.67 Mpc). However, 15 non-redshift measurements give a closer mean distance of 204.76 ± 19.97 Mly (62.780 ± 6.122 Mpc). It was discovered by German-British astronomer William Herschel on 11 March 1788.

NGC 4708 has a possible active galactic nucleus, i.e. it has a compact region at the center of a galaxy that emits a significant amount of energy across the electromagnetic spectrum, with characteristics indicating that this luminosity is not produced by the stars.

NGC 4708 and neighboring galaxy LEDA 970118 are listed together as Holm 463 in Erik Holmberg's A Study of Double and Multiple Galaxies Together with Inquiries into some General Metagalactic Problems, published in 1937.

== Supernovae ==
Three supernovae have been observed in NGC 4708:

- SN 2003ef (Type II, mag. 16.3) was discovered by LOTOSS (Lick Observatory and Tenagra Observatory Supernova Searches) on 11 May 2003.
- SN 2005bo (Type Ia, mag. 15.3) was discovered by Tim Puckett and Alex Langoussis on 17 April 2005.
- SN 2016cvn (Type Ia, mag. 17.97) was discovered by ATLAS on 5 June 2016.

== See also ==
- List of NGC objects (4001–5000)
