= Abell 2390 =

Galaxy cluster in the constellation Pegasus

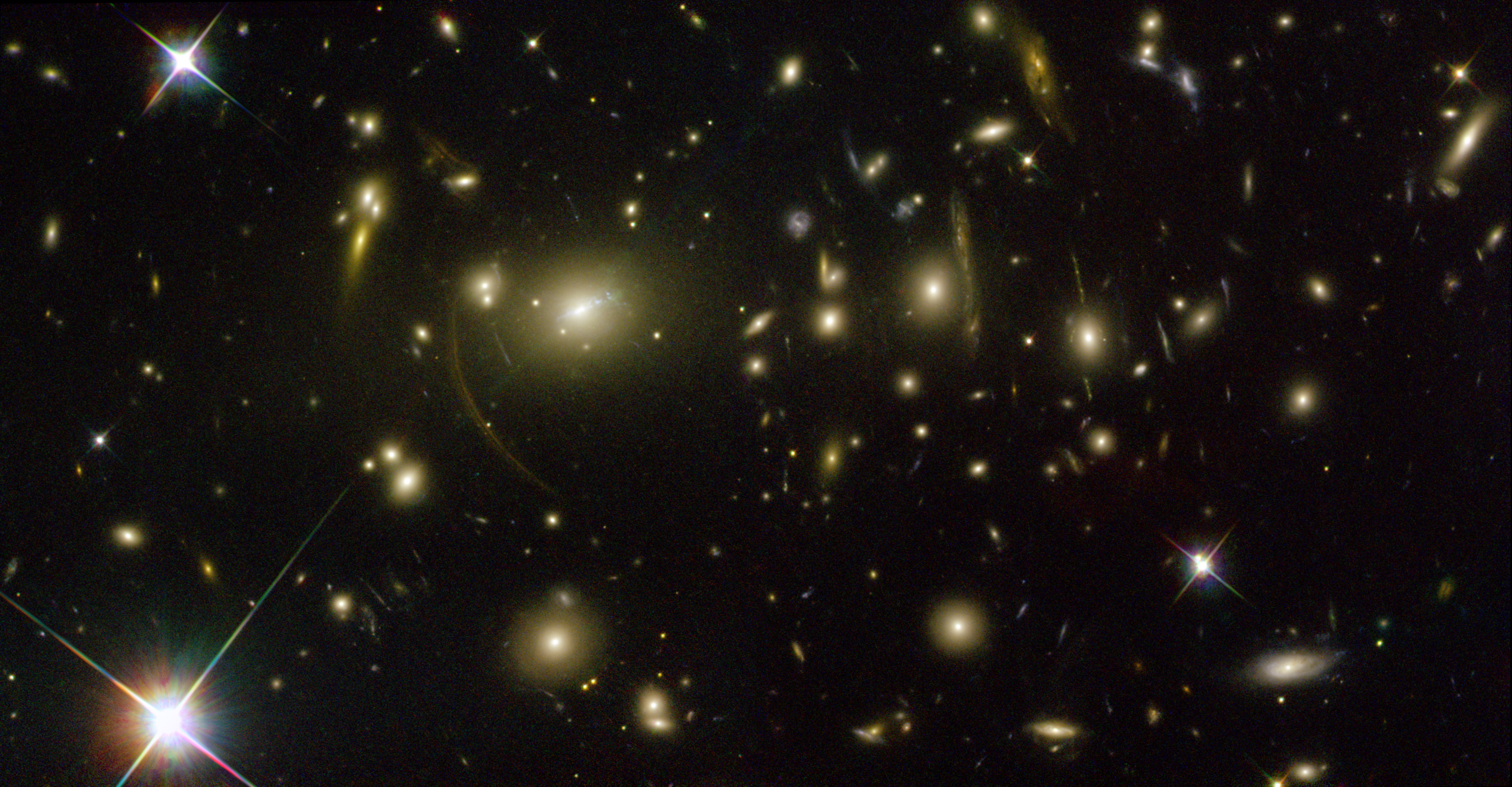

Observation data (Epoch J2000)
- Constellation: Pegasus
- Right ascension: 21^{h} 53^{m} 34.6^{s}
- Declination: +17° 40′ 11″
- Brightest member: LEDA 140982
- Richness class: 1
- Redshift: 0.22800
- Distance: 919 Mpc (2,997 Mly) h^{−1}_{0.705}
- ICM temperature: 8.89 keV
- Binding mass: 10.74×10^{14} M_{☉}
- X-ray flux: (9.60 ± 23.4%)×10^{−12} erg s^{−1} cm^{−2} (0.1–2.4 keV)

Abell 2390 is a massive galaxy cluster located in the constellation Pegasus. It is classified as an X-ray and rich galaxy clusters measured cooling rate of 200–300 M_{☉}yr^{−1}. The galaxy cluster contains a cD galaxy called Abell 2390 BCG (short for brightest cluster galaxy), associated with a complex radio source, B2151+141.

A study has been conducted on the galaxy members of Abell 2390 and finds each of them has different morphology classifications. Further evidence also points out only a few galaxies show star formations, indicating starbursts play no major role in propelling the galaxy cluster's evolution.

Based on weak gravitational distortion of galaxies lying in the background, dark matter distribution is detected in Abell 2390. Its X-ray distribution in the cluster is elliptical and distorted by its sub-structure on a large scale according to an X-ray ROSAT/HRI observation.

== Brightest Cluster Galaxy ==
The brightest cluster galaxy of Abell 2390 is the supergiant elliptical galaxy, LEDA 140982. It is a Fanaroff-Riley class II radio galaxy hosting a luminous powerful radio source with extended optical emission lines. According to studies published in 2006, the source of LEDA 140982 is found peculiar with a misaligned, compact twin radio jet structure created by the host galaxy's apparent structure. Based on evidence, it might be caused by the precession of its central supermassive black hole. Another study shows the galaxy also contains molecular gas, with some located in a one-sided plume from the galaxy's center.

== See also ==
- Abell catalogue
- List of Abell clusters
- X-ray astronomy
