= Spitzer Infrared Nearby Galaxies Survey =

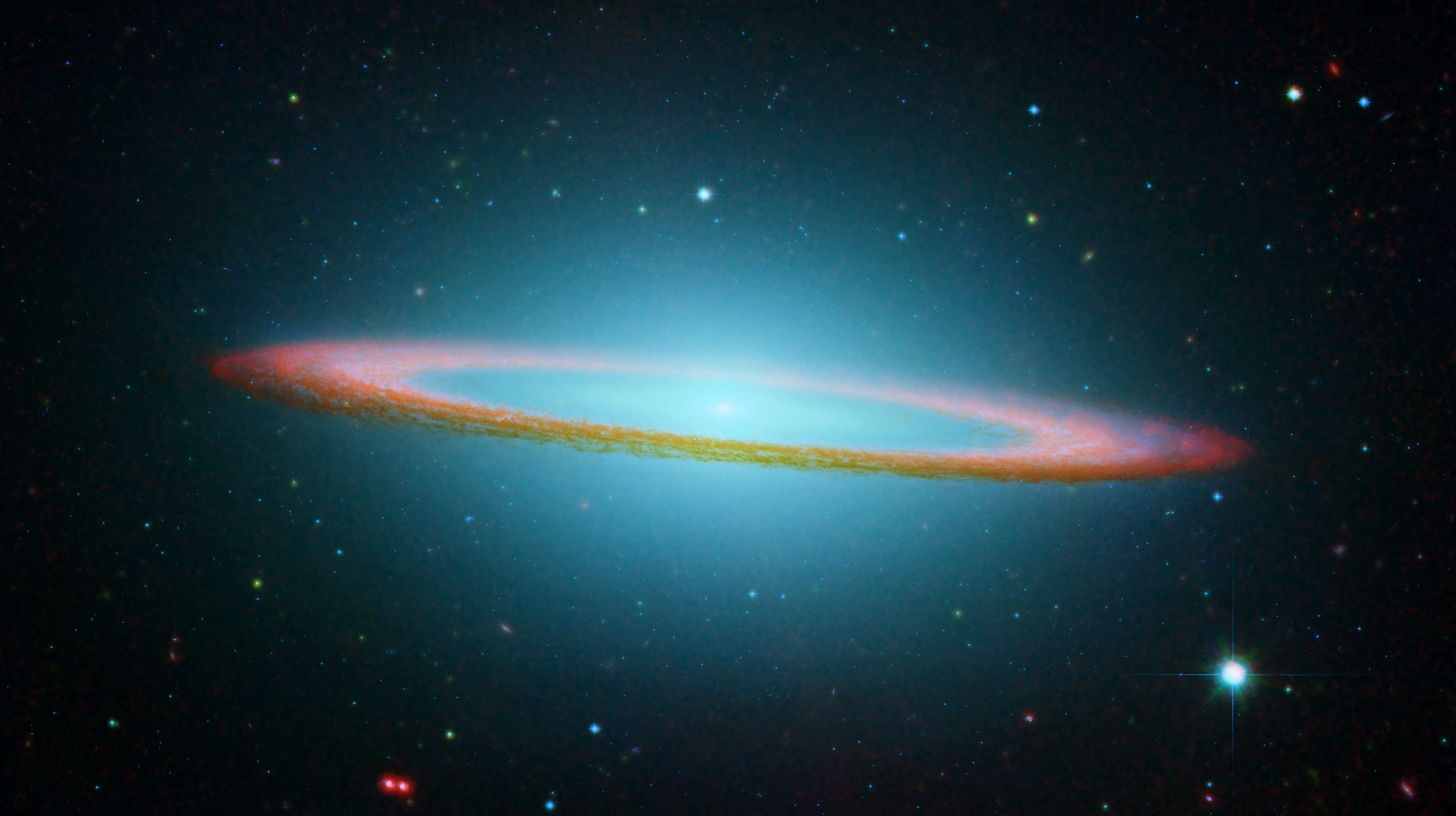
Composite images using data from SINGS and the Hubble Telescope, such as this infrared image of the Sombrero Galaxy, are among the best images of the sampled galaxies to date.

The Spitzer Infrared Nearby Galaxies Survey (SINGS) was a survey of 75 galaxies using the Spitzer Space Telescope, carried out between 2003 and 2006.

One of the telescope's six Legacy Science Projects, SINGS collected a comprehensive set of spectroscopic data in the infrared region, which, in conjunction with measurements at other wavelengths, was intended to provide insights into star formation and other processes occurring within these galaxies.
