= NGC 5291 =

Interacting galaxies in the constellation Centaurus

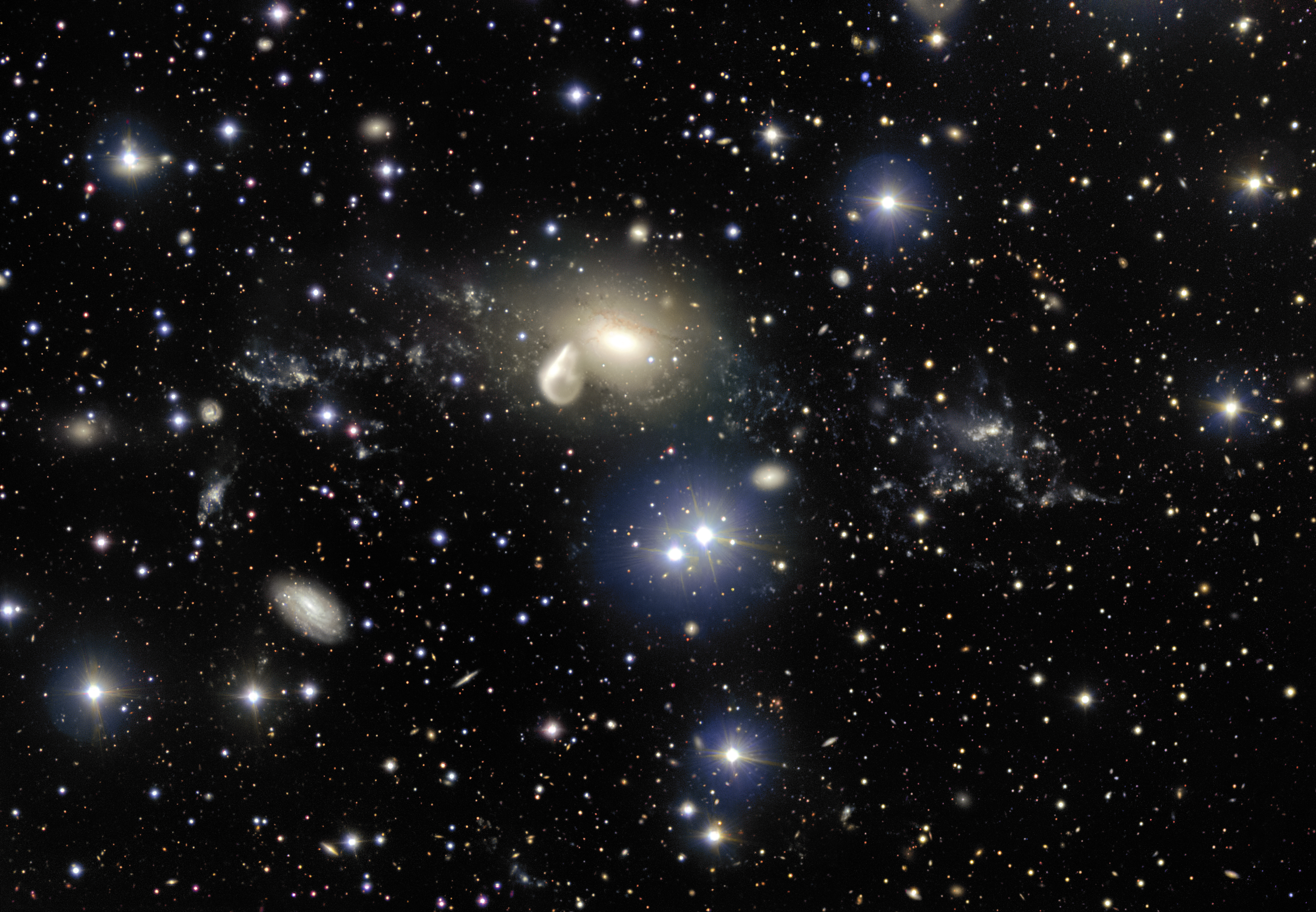
- NGC 5291 image from ESO’s Very Large Telescope at the Paranal Observatory.

Observation data (J2000 epoch)
- Constellation: Centaurus
- Right ascension: 13^{h} 47^{m} 24.5087^{s}
- Declination: −30° 24′ 25.603″
- Redshift: 0.014602±0.000019
- Heliocentric radial velocity: 4,378±6 km/s
- Distance: 177.43 ± 9.78 Mly (54.400 ± 3.000 Mpc)
- Apparent magnitude (V): 15.1

Characteristics
- Type: E pec
- Size: ~85,300 ly (26.16 kpc) (estimated)
- Apparent size (V): 1.1′ × 0.7′

Other designations
- ESO 445- G 030, MCG -05-33-006, PGC 48893

NGC 5291 is a system of interacting galaxies in the constellation Centaurus. Its velocity with respect to the cosmic microwave background is 4,648±20 km/s, which corresponds to a Hubble distance of 223.6 ± 15.7 Mly (68.55 ± 4.81 Mpc). However, two non-redshift measurements give a closer mean distance of 177.43 ± 9.78 Mly (54.400 ± 3.000 Mpc). It was discovered by British astronomer John Herschel on 8 May 1834.

NGC 5291 is surrounded by a collisional ring, containing a young and star-forming tidal dwarf galaxy, where dark matter has been detected. It is also a Seyfert II galaxy, i.e. it has a quasar-like nucleus with very high surface brightnesses whose spectra reveal strong, high-ionisation emission lines, but unlike quasars, the host galaxy is clearly detectable.

== See also ==
- List of NGC objects (5001–6000)
