= Intracluster globular clusters =

Globular clusters not bounded to galaxies

The Fornax cluster is a galaxy cluster located in the Fornax constellation known to have intracluster globular clusters.

Intracluster globular clusters (also known as Intracluster GCs or shortened to ICGCs) are a type of globular cluster (GC) that are not bounded by the gravity of individual galaxies. Because they are unbounded by galaxies, they roam freely throughout galaxy clusters. These types of globular clusters originate as debris that were tidally stripped from interacting galaxies or galaxy mergers, often stripped off from low-mass dwarf galaxies. They may alternatively form as an already unbounded globular clusters (in situ).
