= Erik Holmberg (astronomer) =

Swedish astronomer and cosmologist (1908-2000)

- Born: 13 November 1908; Sweden
- Died: 1 February 2000 (aged 91); Gothenburg, Sweden
- Education: Lund University
- Known for: Effects of interacting galaxies
- Scientific career
- Fields: Astronomy, cosmology

Erik Holmberg (13 November 1908 – 1 February 2000) was a Swedish astronomer and cosmologist. He is most famous for his work in the effects of interacting galaxies. This research showed that galaxies that came near each other would likely combine to form a larger galaxy.

In 1908, Holmberg was born to Malcolm and Anna Holmberg in Skillingaryd, Sweden. In 1947 he married Martha Asdahl. They had one daughter named Osa, who was born in 1953. He died on 1 February 2000 in Gothenburg, at the age of 91.

== Scientific work ==
In 1941, Holmberg performed arguably the first N-body simulation on the dynamics of interacting galaxies. In order to simulate the effect, he constructed an array of 37 lightbulbs.

Using photocells, he was able to measure the simulated force of gravity - because both gravity and light would follow an inverse square law. He concluded that, over time, the 'galaxies' would move closer toward each other. He also concluded in a later experiment that elliptical galaxies are generally older than spiral galaxies, among other discoveries.

The Holmberg radius, a measure for the size of a galaxy on the sky, is named after him. The Holmberg effect is also named after his observation that the satellite galaxies of a disk galaxy tend to be located along the disk galaxy minor axis. The evidences of such effect remain however debated.

== See also ==
- Holmberg II
- Holmberg IX
- Holmberg 15A
