= Type-cD galaxy =

Galaxy morphology classification

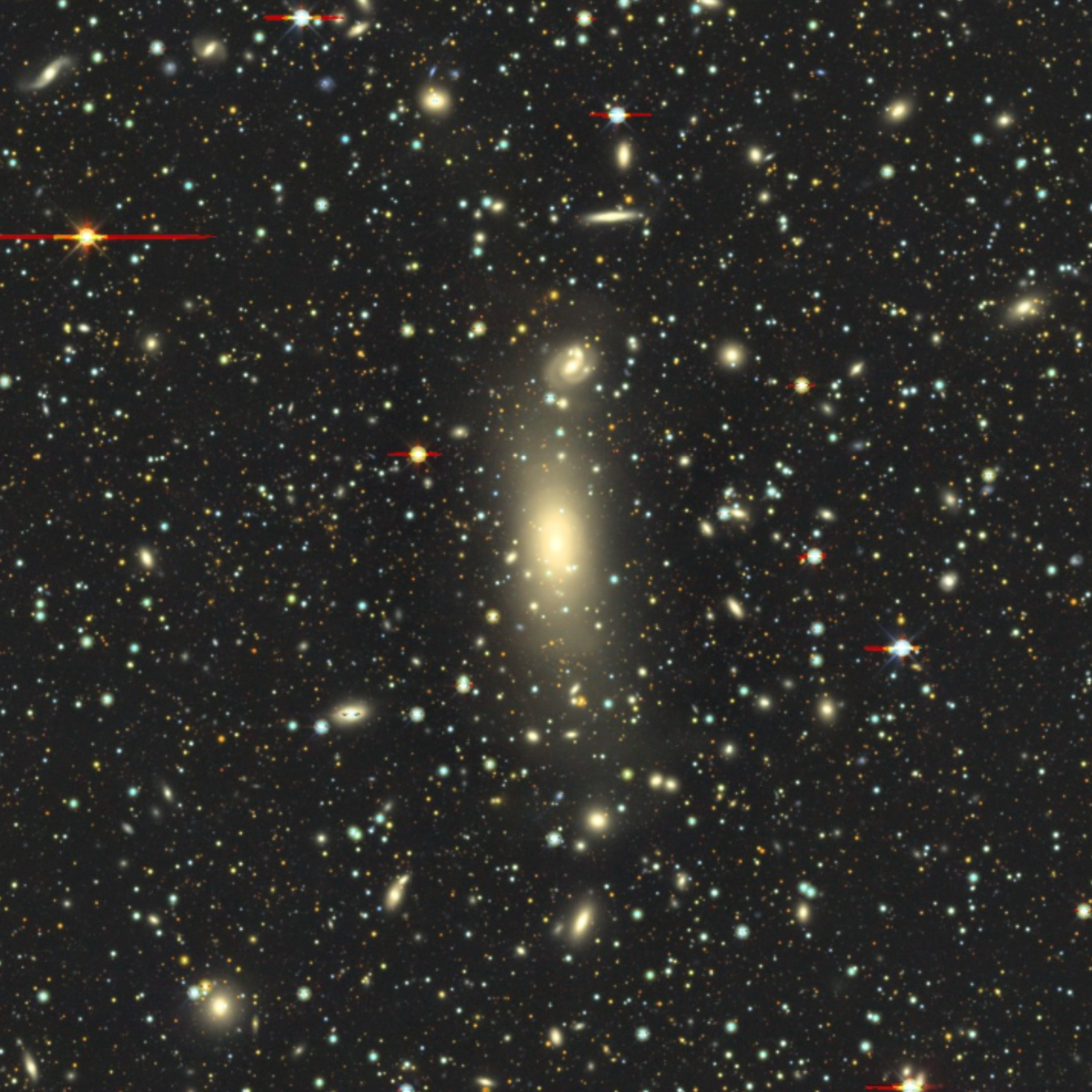
ESO 383-76 within the Abell 3571 cluster, imaged by Dark Energy Spectroscopic Instrument in 2019

The type-cD galaxy (also cD-type galaxy, cD galaxy) is a galaxy morphology classification, a subtype of type-D giant elliptical galaxy. Characterized by a large halo of stars, they can be found near the centres of some rich galaxy clusters. They are also known as supergiant ellipticals or central dominant galaxies.

== Characteristics ==
The cD-type is a classification in the Yerkes galaxy classification scheme, one of two Yerkes classifications still in common use, along with D-type. The "c" in "cD" refers to the fact that the galaxies are very large, hence the adjective supergiant, while the "D" refers to the fact that the galaxies appear diffuse. A back-formation of "cD" is frequently used to indicate "central Dominant galaxy". cDs are also frequently considered the largest galaxies.

cD galaxies are similar to lenticular galaxies (S0) or elliptical galaxies (E#), but many times larger, some having envelopes that exceed one million light years in radius. They appear elliptical-like, with large low surface brightness envelopes which may belong as much to the galaxy cluster as the cD galaxy. It is currently thought that cDs are the result of galaxy mergers. Some cDs have multiple galactic nuclei. cD galaxies are one of the types frequently found to be the brightest cluster galaxy (BCG) of a cluster. Many fossil group galaxies are similar to cD BCG galaxies, leading some to theorize that the cD results from the creation of a fossil group, and then the new cluster accumulating around the fossil group. However, cDs themselves are not found as field galaxies, unlike fossil groups. cDs form around 20% of BCGs.

== Importance ==
Massive galaxies such as supergiant elliptical galaxies are important to understanding the evolution of the universe, because they, along with other large-early type galaxies, account for half of the Universe's stellar mass, contribute significantly to its chemical enrichment and provide clues to the star formation history of the universe.

== Growth ==
cD galaxies are believed to grow via mergers of galaxies that spiral in to the center of a galaxy cluster, a theory first proposed by Herbert J. Rood in 1965. This "cannibalistic" mode of growth leads to the large diameter and luminosity of the cDs. The second-brightest galaxy in the cluster is usually under-luminous, a consequence of its having been "eaten". Remains of "eaten" galaxies sometimes appear as a diffuse halo of gas and dust, or tidal streams, or undigested off-center nuclei in the cD galaxy. The envelope or halo may also consist of the "intra-cluster light", originating from stars stripped away from their original galaxy, and it can be up to 3 million light years in diameter. It is estimated that the cD galaxy alone contributes 1–7%, depending on the cluster mass, of the total baryon mass within 12.5 virial radii.

=== Dynamical friction ===
Dynamical friction is believed to play an important role in the formation of cD galaxies at the centres of galaxy clusters. This process begins when the motion of a large galaxy in a cluster attracts smaller galaxies and dark matter into a wake behind it. This over-density follows behind the larger galaxy and exerts a constant gravitational force on it, causing it to slow down. As it loses kinetic energy, the large galaxy gradually spirals toward the centre of the cluster. Once there, the stars, gas, dust and dark matter of the large galaxy and its trailing galaxies will join with those of other galaxies who preceded them in the same fate. A giant or supergiant diffuse or elliptical galaxy will result from this accumulation. The centers of merged or merging galaxies can remain recognizable for long times, appearing as multiple "nuclei" of the cD galaxy.

== cD clusters ==
Type-cD galaxies are also used to define clusters. A galaxy cluster with a cD at its centre is termed a "cD cluster" or "cD galaxy cluster" or "cD cluster of galaxies".

== Examples ==
- 3C 401
- Abell 1201 BCG
- Abell 1413 BCG
- Abell 2261 BCG
- Abell 2390 BCG
- ESO 383-76, the large central galaxy of Abell 3571
- ESO 444-46, the central galaxy of Shapley Supercluster
- Holmberg 15A (home to one of the largest black holes currently known)
- IC 1101, the large central galaxy of the massive cluster Abell 2029.
- Messier 87, the central galaxy in the Virgo Cluster
- NeVe 1, the host galaxy of the Ophiuchus Supercluster eruption event, the most energetic outburst known.
- NGC 1399 in the Fornax Cluster
- NGC 4889, is also known as the Caldwell 35, a supergiant galaxy, a class-4 elliptical galaxy, it is the brightest within Caldwell Objects in the constellation Coma Berenices
- NGC 6086
- NGC 6166
- Perseus A
- QSO 0957, the first identified gravitationally lensed object

== See also ==
- Elliptical galaxy (E#)
- Giant elliptical galaxy (gE)
- Lenticular galaxy (S0, SA0, SAB0, SB0, E9)
- Seyfert galaxy
- Type-D galaxy
- List of largest galaxies - a broader list containing type-cD galaxies, arranged by size.
