= IC 1101 =

Galaxy in the constellation Virgo

- Image of IC 1101 taken in June 1995 by the Hubble Space Telescope

Observation data (J2000 epoch)
- Constellation: Virgo
- Right ascension: 15^{h} 10^{m} 56.1^{s}
- Declination: +05° 44′ 41″
- Redshift: 0.078054±0.000027
- Heliocentric radial velocity: 23,400 ± 8 km/s (14,540.1 ± 5.0 mi/s)
- Distance: 345.5 ± 24 Mpc (1,126.9 ± 78.3 million ly)h^{−1}_{0.67}
- Group or cluster: Abell 2029
- Apparent magnitude (V): 13.22

Characteristics
- Type: cD; S0-
- Size: 123.65 to 169.61 kpc (403,300 to 553,200 ly) (D_{25} B-band and total K-band isophotes) (Note: The diameters given at NED were based on a redshift-independent distance measurement. The diameters given here were based on NED's provided scale "Virgo + GA + Shapley" multiplied with the given angular diameter values of the estimation methods being stated.)
- Apparent size (V): 1'.2 × 0'.6

Other designations
- A2029-BCG, UGC 9752, PGC 54167

IC 1101 is a class S0 supergiant (cD) lenticular galaxy at the center of the Abell 2029 galaxy cluster. It has an isophotal diameter at about 123.65 to 169.61 kiloparsecs (400,000 to 550,000 light-years). It possesses a diffuse core, which is the largest core of any galaxy known to date, and contains a supermassive black hole, one of the largest discovered.

IC 1101 is located at 354.0 megaparsecs (1.15 billion light-years) from Earth. It was officially discovered by American astronomer Edward D. Swift on 19 June 1890, although it had been observed as much as century earlier by William Herschel, who mistook it for a nebula within the Milky Way. (Note: Some sources incorrectly claim the discovery was by William Herschel in 1790.)

== Observation history ==
IC 1101 was catalogued in the Index Catalogue of galaxies in the late 1800s to the early 1900s, which is where the galaxy got its most-used designation. In a 1964 study of galaxies accompanied by radio sources, IC 1101 was listed as being among the diffuse elliptical galaxies chosen for the study. The study noted that IC 1101 had not been considered as a radio source, but radio emissions similar to galaxies with such emissions were detected.

Almost a decade and a half later, in 1978, astronomer Alan Dressler analyzed 12 very rich clusters of galaxies, among them Abell 2029, where IC 1101 is located. The following year, he released a paper dedicated solely to IC 1101 and its related dynamics and properties, revealing a rising velocity dispersion profile. After this, he would publish a paper overviewing his recent studies on the cluster and the galaxy.

During 1985, a team of astronomers obtained the spectra of the gas inside several galaxy clusters known to be luminous at X-ray wavelengths, including Abell 2029. Soon after, an investigation into the dynamics of IC 1101 and the galaxies within a few hundred kiloparsecs of it was conducted.

The centers of galaxy clusters are considered to be among the best laboratories for the study of galaxy and cluster evolution, and so during the late 1980s to early 1990s, numerous papers were released, surveying many brightest cluster galaxies. Among them was IC 1101. R-band (red light) luminosity profiles were soon obtained for IC 1101, revealing a very vast halo of light that could be traced out for more than several hundred kiloparsecs from the galaxy's center.

In 2002, an analysis of Chandra X-ray surveys of the cluster was performed. In 2011, a survey of over 430 brightest cluster galaxies was conducted, among them IC 1101.

In 2017, a redshift survey of the cluster was conducted, allowing a list of velocity dispersions to be created. This constrains the dynamics of the cluster. That same year, an analysis of the galaxy's inner regions using Hubble Space Telescope images found a huge yet diffuse galactic core, accompanied with mass estimates of the central supermassive black hole.

During 2019–2020, 170 local galaxy clusters were surveyed for a study of brightest cluster galaxies, their structures and the intracluster light around them.

== Characteristics ==
=== Morphology ===
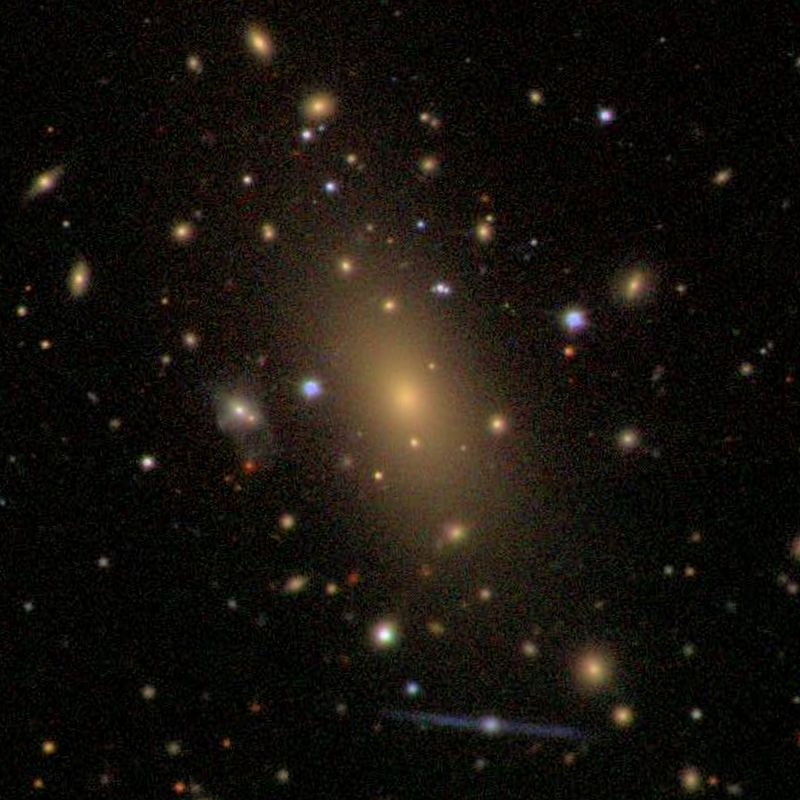
IC 1101 imaged by the Sloan Digital Sky Survey

The galaxy is classified as a supergiant elliptical (E) to lenticular (S0) and is the brightest galaxy in A2029 (hence its other designation A2029-BCG; BCG meaning brightest cluster galaxy). The galaxy's morphological type is debated due to it possibly being shaped like a flat disc but only visible from Earth at its broadest dimensions. A morphology of S0^{-} (Hubble stage −2; see Hubble stage for details) has been given by the Third Reference Catalogue of Bright Galaxies (RC3) in 1991.

=== Components and structure ===
Like most large galaxies, IC 1101 is populated by a number of metal-rich stars, some of which are as much as seven billion years older than the Sun, making it appear golden yellow in color. It has a very bright radio source at the center, which is likely associated with an ultramassive black hole in the current estimated mass of 97.7+171.4
−62.2 billion M_{☉} measured using the break radius of the central core (10^{10.99 ± 0.44}) (with the range being 35.5 billion M_{☉} to 269.1 billion M_{☉}), or alternatively at 50–70 billion M_{☉} using gas accretion rate and growth modelling, or 40–100 billion M_{☉} using core dynamical models, which would make IC 1101's black hole one of the most massive known to date. The estimates of the mass of IC 1101's black hole are near the upper bound of cosmological limits, and is referred to as an "overmassive" black hole.

IC 1101's mass-to-light ratio has been described as being anomalously high. The galaxy also has a unique velocity dispersion profile, which indicates a massive dark matter halo. The Abell 2029 cluster in which IC 1101 resides accretes roughly 450 solar masses per year. The galaxy lacks nuclear emission in visible light at its center as well as signs of recent star formation. There is also no evidence of dust lanes in the core.

A 2017 paper suggests that IC 1101 has the largest core size of any galaxy, with a core radius of around 4.2 ± 0.1 kpc (13.70 ± 0.33 thousand ly) by fitting a model to a Hubble Space Telescope (HST) image of the galaxy. This makes its core larger than the one observed in A2261-BCG, which is 3.2 kpc (10 thousand ly). The core is also roughly an order of magnitude larger than the cores of other large elliptical galaxies, such as NGC 4889 and NGC 1600. Estimates of the absolute magnitude of IC 1101's spheroid are very faint for such a large core, indicating a large stellar mass deficit estimated at 4.9×10^{11} M_{☉} and a large luminosity deficit estimated at 1.1×10^{11} L_{☉}. A hypothesis for the observed properties and peculiarities of the core is that the merger of the central black holes from the formation of the galaxy flung stars out of the core. However, when examining large and diffuse galactic cores, caution must be taken, as estimates may differ between the computer models used.

IC 1101's major axis is oriented in the northeast to southwest direction. The major axis is even aligned on the axis by which Abell 2029 accretes from Abell 2033. Its components such as the core and main body are well-aligned, but the halo is twisted by 20 degrees from the galaxy's other components. Its isophotes (The shapes connecting areas with the same surface brightness) are predominantly boxy. Closer to the core, IC 1101's isophotes become elongated, suggesting a nuclear disc. This feature might be due to an unresolved double nucleus, produced by a low intensity active galactic nucleus (AGN) or a disrupted satellite galaxy disturbed by the central black hole. Several elliptical galaxies like NGC 4438-B, NGC 5419, and VCC 128 contain two point-sources, producing high ellipticities. The NRAO VLA sky-survey detected a radio source near IC 1101, corroborating a possible AGN. Another, weaker radio source has also been detected nearby, opening up the possibility of a double AGN that cannot be ruled out.

Like most BCGs, IC 1101 has a massive and diffuse stellar halo and has some excessive halo light. The halo is twisted by 20 degrees from the main body and core of IC 1101. This feature, among others, seems to be the reason why IC 1101 is classified as a lenticular galaxy in RC3.

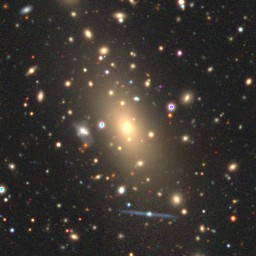
IC 1101 imaged by the 9th data release of the Legacy survey.

=== Size ===
IC 1101 is considered a large galaxy characterized by an extensive, diffuse halo. This is the intracluster light, or ICL, free-flying stars that are not bound to any galaxy. This ubiquitous mass of stars within galaxy clusters are usually more concentrated around the brightest cluster galaxies, such as IC 1101, however. Photometrically, the ICL is indistinguishable from the brightest cluster galaxy, but it can be distinguished kinematically. During the early 2000s, weak-lensing estimates for Abell 2029 were taken, indicating the distribution of the mass throughout the cluster and galaxy.

Defining the size of a galaxy varies according to the method used in the astronomical literature. Photographic plates of blue light from the galaxy (sampling stars excluding the diffuse halo) yield an effective radius (the radius within which half the light is emitted) of 65 ± 12 kpc (212 ± 39 thousand ly) based on an earlier distance measurement. The galaxy has a very large halo of much lower intensity "diffuse light" extending to a radius of 600 kpc (2 million ly). The authors of the study identifying the halo conclude that IC 1101 is "possibly one of the largest and most luminous galaxies in the universe". This view has been stated in several other papers as well, but this figure was based on an earlier assumed distance of 262 megaparsecs (855 million light-years).

A more recent measurement, using the 30 magnitude/arcsec^{2} standard utilizing the ultra-deep G- and R- band imaging from the Isaac Newton Telescope's Wide Field Camera, has yielded a diameter of 520 kiloparsecs, or about 1.7 million light-years. This would make it one of the largest and most luminous galaxies known, though there are other galaxies with larger isophotal diameter measurements (such as ESO 383-76 and LEDA 2222102).

=== Distance ===
The distance to IC 1101 has also been uncertain, with different methods across different wavelengths producing varying results. An earlier distance calculation from 1980 using the galaxy's photometric property yield a distance of 262.0 Mpc (855 million ly) and a redshift of z = 0.077, based on a Hubble constant value H_{0} of 60 km/s/Mpc. The RC3 catalogue gave a nearly similar value of z = 0.078, based on optical emission lines, a value conformed to as recently as 2017 based on luminosity, stellar mass, and velocity dispersion functions, all yielding distances of 354.0 megaparsecs (1.2 billion light-years) based on the modern value of the Hubble constant H_{0} = 67.8 km/s/Mpc; the currently accepted values. Lower redshifts have been calculated for other wavelengths such as the photometric redshift measurement by the Two Micron All-Sky Survey (2MASS) in 2014, which gave a value of z = 0.045, translating to a distance of 197.1 megaparsecs (643 million light-years). A measurement made in 2005 by the Arecibo Observatory using the 21-cm hydrogen emission line yields a redshift of z = 0.021, and hence a distance of 97.67 ± 6.84 megaparsecs (318.6 ± 22.3 million light-years). However, the hydrogen emission is likely sourced from the foreground galaxy LEDA 5057632.

== Formation ==
The lack of other bright and luminous galaxies other than IC 1101 at the center of the Abell 2029 galaxy cluster suggests that they were absorbed and consumed ("chewed-up") by the nascent IC 1101. Since the halo is somewhat flattened, the halo most likely retained the distribution of the bright luminous galaxies as they were consumed.

The depleted core and other characteristics of IC 1101 such as the halo component and its structure at moderate distances from the center suggest that the galaxy underwent numerous galactic mergers and interactions, perhaps as much as 10 or even more. The smoothness of the halo suggests that it formed early in the history of the cluster.

== See also ==
- List of galaxies
