= 4C 73.08 =

Radio galaxy in the constellation Draco

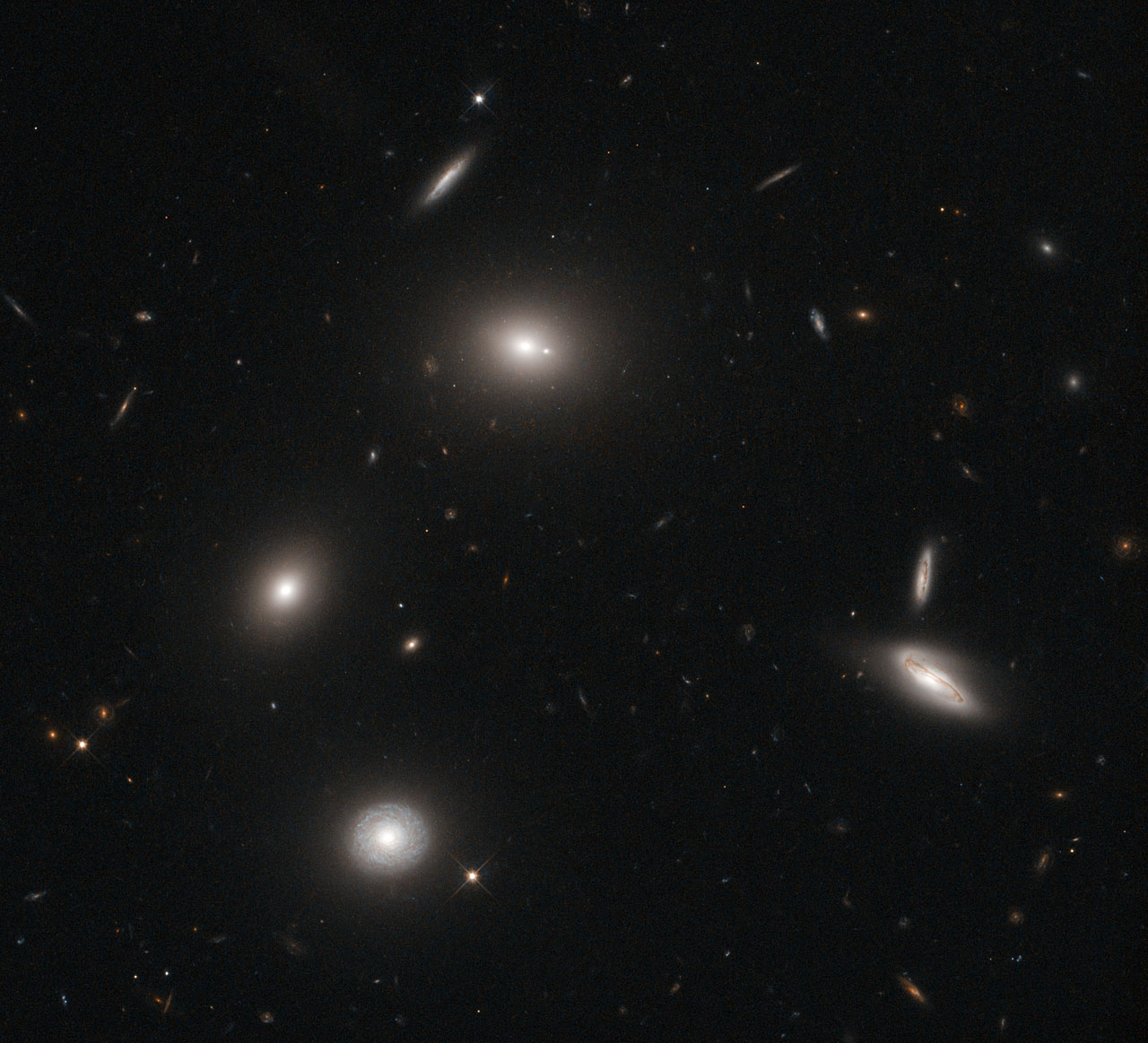
- HST image of 4C 73.08. Also in the image are galaxies; LEDA 2754266 & LEDA 2754392

Observation data (J2000 epoch)
- Constellation: Draco
- Right ascension: 09^{h} 49^{m} 45.94^{s}
- Declination: +73° 14′ 23.00″
- Redshift: 0.047280
- Heliocentric radial velocity: 14,174 ± 878 km/s
- Distance: 689.6 ± 7,681.0 Mly (211.44 ± 2,355 Mpc)
- magnitude (J): 12.95

Characteristics
- Type: FR II NLRG
- Size: ~170,000 ly (52.0 kpc) (estimated)

Other designations
- 2MASX J09494596+7314232, PGC 28261, VII Zw 292, 8C 0944+734, PBC J0950.0+7315, IVS B0945+734

4C 73.08 is a Fanaroff-Riley Class Type II radio galaxy located in the constellation of Draco. The redshift of the galaxy is (z) 0.047 and it was first discovered by U. Stute in 1981. This object has also been said to be classified as a giant radio galaxy. It is also the brightest cluster galaxy of a small galaxy group.

== Description ==
4C 73.08 is hosted by an elliptical galaxy. When observed, the radio source of the galaxy is found compact, with known protrusion features extending outwards from both of the radio lobes. The lobes are also connected together by bridges of radio emission. There are also strong detections of radio polarization located at both north and south protrusion extensions of the lobes. The total linear extent of the source is estimated to be 1.7 megaparsecs. A compact radio core is clearly detected based on radio imaging.

New radio observations in 2013 would find 4C 73.08 has a double-lobed structure that is found to contain several components. The hotspot located in the southern component is the brightest known feature while the hotspot in the northern lobe is fainter and also located centrally. Wing-like features are also exhibited by both lobes with ridgelines running in perpendicular direction towards the position of the major axis and curving away from the nucleus's direction. The radio core contains a flat radio spectrum.

A radio jet initially thought as one-sided, is shown to have a symmetrical appearance. The lobes of the source are surrounded by radio emission on megaparsec scales. Studies also found 4C 73.08 is classified as a narrow-line radio galaxy.
