= KX Andromedae =

Spectroscopic binary star in the constellation Andromeda

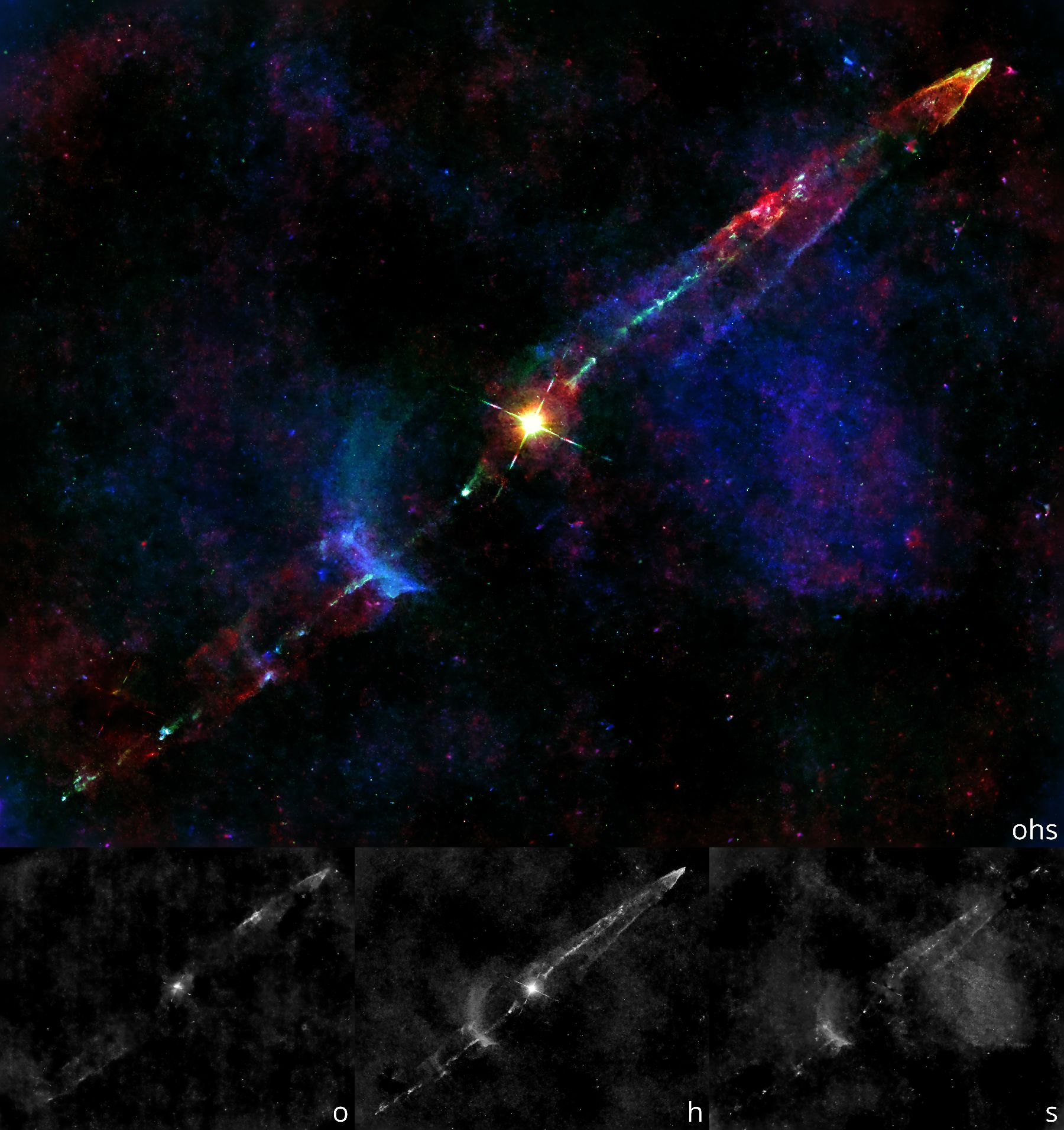
- Bipolar jets ejected from KX Andromedae, imaged in emission lines of sulfur, hydrogen, and oxygen

Observation data Epoch J2000 Equinox ICRS
- Constellation: Andromeda
- Right ascension: 23^{h} 07^{m} 06.21216^{s}
- Declination: +50° 11′ 32.4886″
- Apparent magnitude (V): 6.88 – 7.28 variable

Characteristics
- Spectral type: B3pe+K1III
- Apparent magnitude (U): 6.79
- Apparent magnitude (B): 7.25
- Apparent magnitude (V): 6.92
- Apparent magnitude (G): 6.852
- Apparent magnitude (J): 5.845
- Apparent magnitude (H): 5.33
- Apparent magnitude (K): 5.19
- Variable type: Be star

Astrometry
Radial velocity (R_{v})	−7.8±0.9 km/s
Proper motion (μ)	RA: +1.625(19) mas/yr Dec.: −0.761(17) mas/yr
Parallax (π)	1.3172±0.0207 mas
Distance	2,480 ± 40 ly (760 ± 10 pc)

Orbit
Period (P)	38.919 days
Eccentricity (e)	0±0.03
Inclination (i)	50±5°
Periastron epoch (T)	HJD 2423220.25±0.09
Semi-amplitude (K_{2}) (secondary)	86.2±0.8 km/s

Details

Primary
Mass	9.0±0.1 M_{☉}
Age	22.4±3.1 Myr

Secondary
Radius	19±4 R_{☉}
Surface gravity (log g)	2.0±0.5 cgs
Temperature	5000±400 K
Rotational velocity (v sin i)	25±5 km/s

Other designations
- KX And, AAVSO 2302+49, BD+49 4045, HD 218393, HIP 114154, SAO 52701, TYC 3631-1533-1, 2MASS J23070621+5011324

Database references
SIMBAD	data

KX Andromedae (often abbreviated to KX And) is a spectroscopic binary star in the constellation Andromeda. Its apparent visual magnitude varies between 6.88 and 7.28. It is at a distance of 2,480 light-years (760 parsecs).

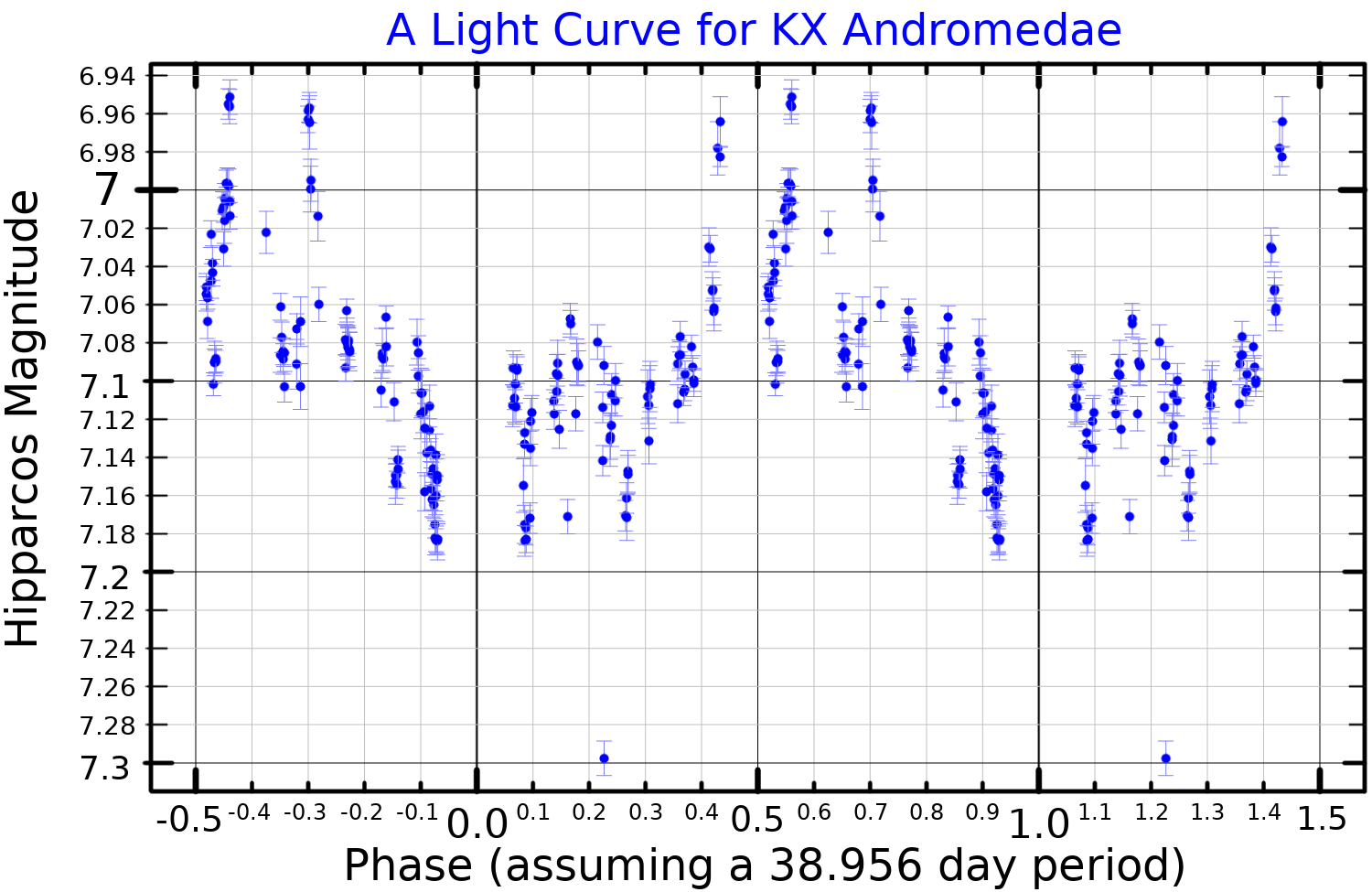
A light curve for KX Andromedae, plotted from Hipparcos data, folded with the period published by Koen and Eyer (2002)

The primary component of the KX Andromedae system is a Be star with a spectral classification B3pe as of 2017, although in historical records it has varied from B1 to B7.

The secondary star is difficult to detect in the spectrum, but has been given a K1III spectral type. It is likely to be an asymptotic giant branch star that fills its Roche lobe, transferring mass to the primary star.

The system is only about 25 million years old. The pair complete a circular orbit every 38.919 days at an inclination of 50°.

KX Andromedae is surrounded by bipolar jets of ejected material, that extend 19 light-years (5.8 parsecs) out from it in each direction (angular size 20′). These faint jets were discovered in hydrogen-alpha emission in 2024 by astronomer Stefan Ziegenbalg. Subsequent studies in other emission lines revealed a more complex structure (see image): the jets were detected only in singly ionized sulfur and hydrogen, while an outer shell is also visible in doubly ionized oxygen. This suggests the presence of different ionization mechanisms. The shell may be visible as a result of shock ionization of the surrounding interstellar medium, whereas the gas within the jets may be ionized by the B3pe component of KX Andromedae, which likely does not emit sufficient energy to doubly ionize oxygen.
