= IGR J11014−6103 =

Nebula in the constellation Carina

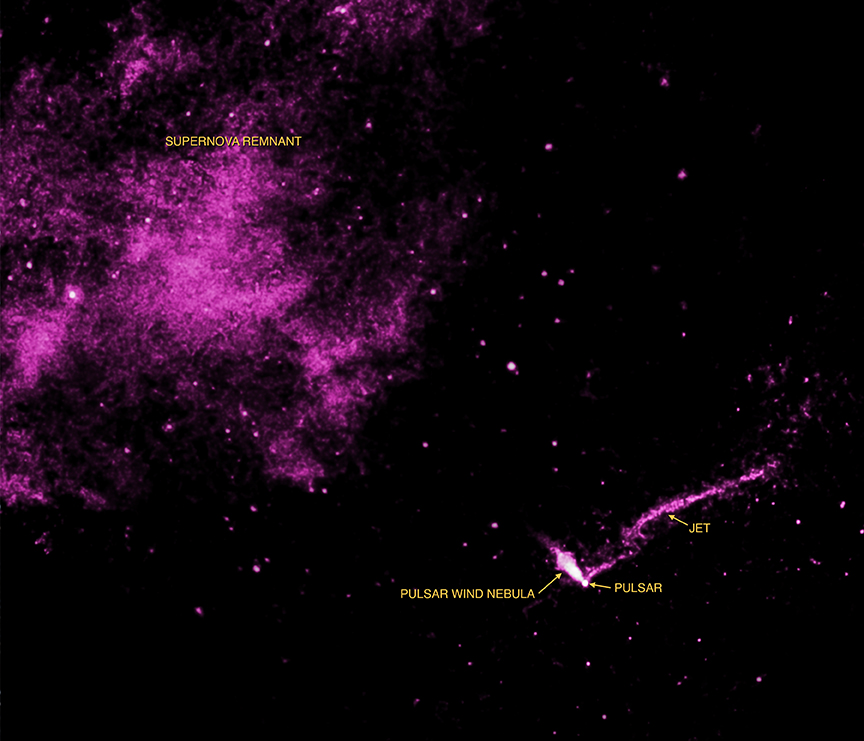
- The pulsar IGR J11014−6103 with supernova remnant origin, nebula and jet
- Object type: Pulsar wind nebula
- Other designations: Lighthouse nebula

Observation data (Epoch J2000)
- Constellation: Carina
- Right ascension: 11^{h} 01^{m} 45.05^{s}
- Declination: −61° 01′ 40.3″
- Radius: 12 kilometers (neutron star)
- Estimated age: 10,000−30,000 years

IGR J11014−6103, also called the Lighthouse Nebula, is a pulsar wind nebula trailing the neutron star which has the longest relativistic jet observed in the Milky Way galaxy.

== Description ==
The object consists of a neutron star with a radius of about 12 km, which formed about 10,000–30,000 years ago in a supernova explosion. The supernova explosion "kicked" the neutron star, which is now moving through space with a velocity of between 0.3% and 0.8% of the speed of light, faster than almost all other known runaway neutron stars. The pulsar is now about 60 light-years from the original supernova location.

The neutron star is the source of a relativistic helical jet, which is observed in X-rays but has no detected radio signature. In the composite processed image (right) the neutron star pulsar is the point-like object with a pulsar wind nebula tail trailing behind it for about 3 light-years. The jet, aligned with the pulsar rotation axis, is perpendicular to the pulsar's trajectory and extends out over 37 light-years (about nine times the distance from the Sun to the nearest visible star). The estimated velocity of the jet is about 80% of the speed of light.

The star was initially presumed to be rapidly spinning but later measurements indicate that its spin rate is only 15.9 Hz. This rather slow spin rate and the fact that there is no evidence of accretion suggests that the jet is neither rotation nor accretion powered. A counter-jet (not shown in the image) has been detected, but is much fainter, possibly due to relativistic beaming. The origin of the glitch at about a third of the jet length is not known, but it might be due to the jet switching off and on or the jet orientation changing.
