= CGCG 049-033 =

Galaxy in the constellation Serpens

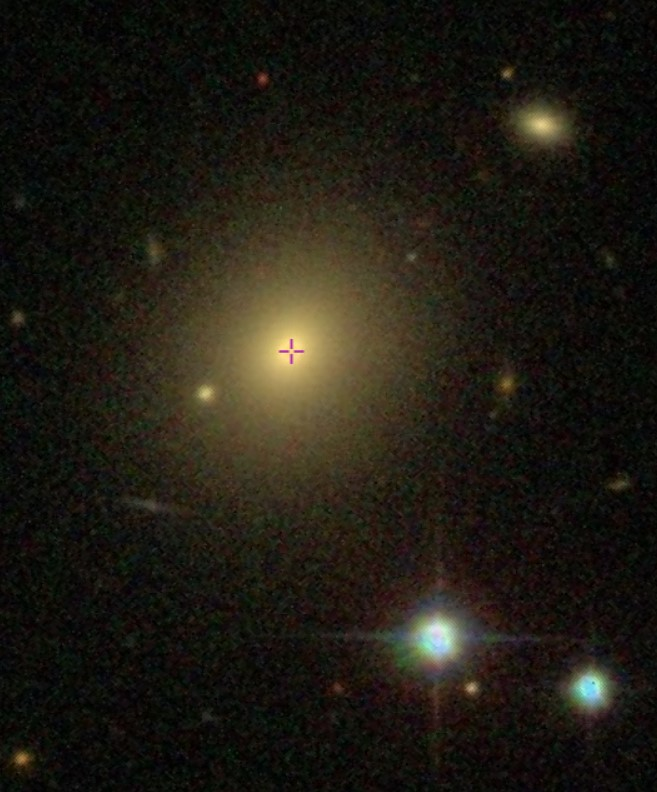
- Sloan Digital Sky Survey image of CGCG 049-033

Observation data (J2000 epoch)
- Constellation: Serpens
- Right ascension: 15^{h} 11^{m} 31.4^{s}
- Declination: +07° 15′ 07″
- Redshift: 0.04483
- Heliocentric radial velocity: 13139 km/s
- Distance: 675.2 Mly (207.01 Mpc)
- Group or cluster: Abell 2040
- Apparent magnitude (B): 14.98

Characteristics
- Type: E
- Apparent size (V): 0.597′ × 0.537′

Other designations
- PGC 54213, 2MASX J15113138+0715068

CGCG 049-033 is an elliptical galaxy, located some 680 million light-years from Earth, in the constellation of Serpens. It is the central galaxy (BCG) of the galaxy cluster Abell 2040.

CGCG 049-033 is known for having the longest galactic jet ever discovered. The beam is about 1.5 million light-years long and was discovered in December 2007. The spectrum of the galaxy suggests a supermassive black hole with a mass of 2×10^{9} M_{☉}.
