= Hercules A =

Radio-source galaxy in the constellation Hercules

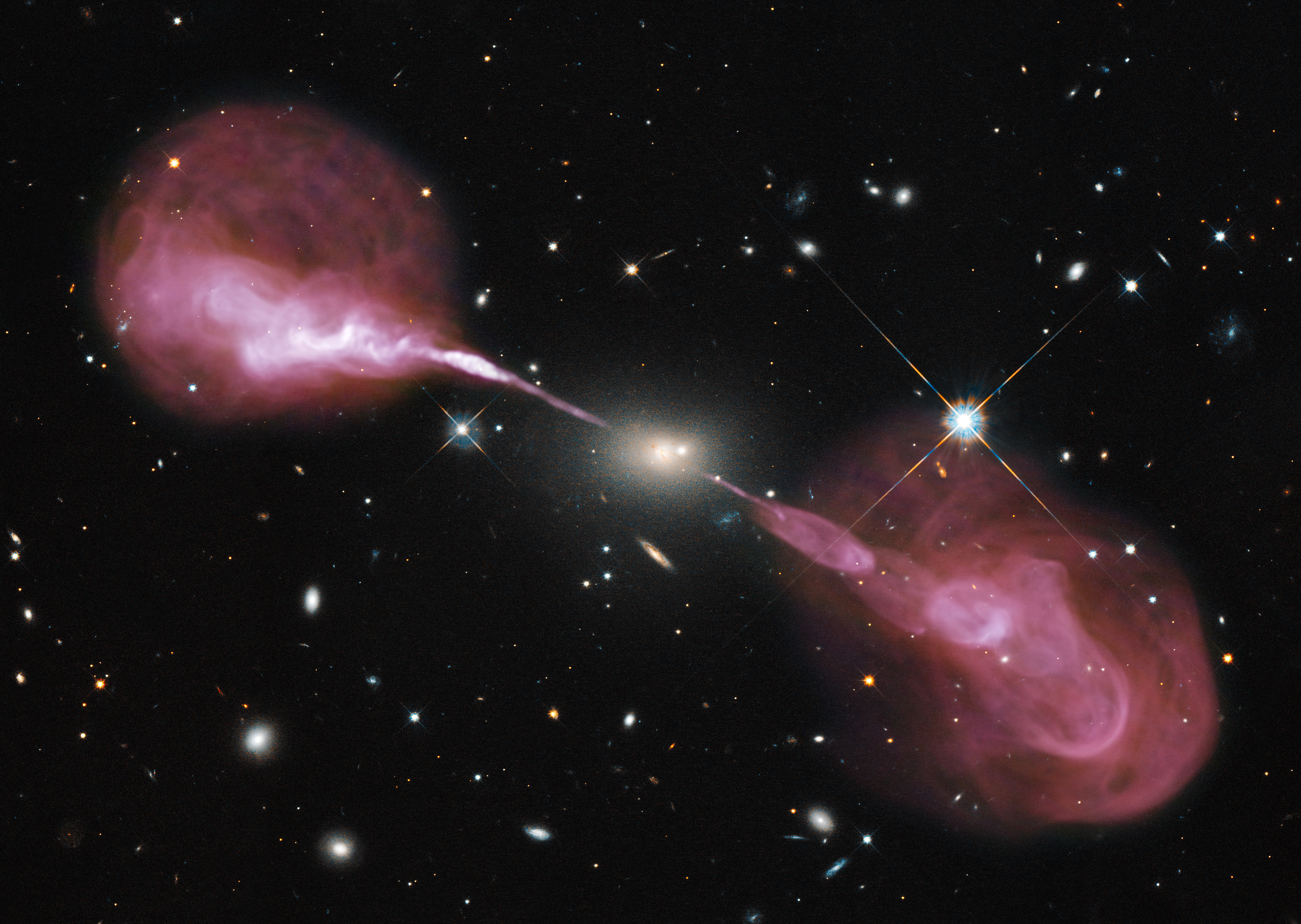
- Visible light image obtained by Hubble superposed with a radio image taken by the VLA.

Observation data (J2000 epoch)
- Constellation: Hercules
- Right ascension: 16^{h} 51^{m} 08.1^{s}
- Declination: +04° 59′ 34″
- Redshift: 0.155000±0.000880
- Heliocentric radial velocity: 46,468±264 km/s
- Galactocentric velocity: 46,558±264 km/s
- Distance: 2,258 ± 158.5 Mly (692.4 ± 48.6 Mpc)h^{−1}_{0.6774} (Comoving); 2,006 Mly (615.0 Mpc)h^{−1}_{0.6774} (Light-travel)
- Apparent magnitude (V): 16.6
- Apparent magnitude (B): 18.1

Characteristics
- Type: WLRG; NLRG ELEG
- Size: 459,820 ly × 285,090 ly (140.98 kpc × 87.41 kpc) (diameter; "total" magnitude) (Note: The quoted diameter in this infobox was based on NED's provided scale "Virgo + GA + Shapley" of 3.357 kpc/arcsec multiplied with given angular diameters.); 164,200 ly × 164,200 ly (50.35 kpc × 50.35 kpc) (diameter; Very low surface brightness)
- Apparent size (V): 0.25′ × 0.25′

Other designations
- Herc A, 3C 348, PGC 59117, 4C +05.66, MCG +01-43-006, NRAO 0518

Hercules A, or 3C 348, is a bright astronomical radio source galaxy in the constellation Hercules. It is an elliptical galaxy, and the origin of one of the largest known astronomical radio sources, emanating 459,820 light years on either side of its point of origin, making the feature nearly a million light years across. Hercules A was first catalogued by astronomers at the University of Cambridge in April 1961 in a paper published to The Observatory.

== Observation ==
During a survey of bright radio sources in the mid-20th century, astronomers found a very bright radio source in the constellation Hercules corresponding to an elliptical galaxy. Its strength in the middle range frequency and emission of synchrotron radiation suggested the source of radio emission may be undergoing a gravitational interaction.

In April 1961, astronomers from the Radio Astronomy Group, later the Cavendish Astrophysics Group, detected the radio source using the Cambridge Interferometer of the Mullard Radio Astronomy Observatory at Cambridge University in the United Kingdom, including it in the Third Cambridge Catalogue of Radio Sources (3C) as 3C 348, the 348th object detected by the survey.

== Characteristics ==
=== Galaxy ===
The galaxy, 3C 348, is a supergiant elliptical galaxy. It is located inside a poor galaxy cluster with an X-ray luminosity of L_{bol} = 4.8 × 10^{37} W. 3C 348 is classified as type E3 to E4 of the updated Hubble–de Vaucouleurs extended galaxy morphological classification scheme. It has a companion galaxy, shown appearing as a secondary nucleus, indicating it is merging.

3C 348, the galaxy located in the center of the image, appears to be a relatively normal elliptical galaxy in visible light. When imaged in radio waves, however, plasma jets over one million light years long appear. Detailed analyses indicate that the galaxy is actually over 1,000 times more massive (approx. 10^{15} M_{☉}) than our Milky Way Galaxy, and the central black hole is nearly 1,000 times more massive (approx. 4 billion M_{☉}) than the black hole at our Milky Way's center, making it one of the largest known. The physics that creates the jets is poorly understood, with a likely energy source being matter ejected perpendicular to the accretion disc of the central black hole which has grown more than 1.7×10^{8} M_{☉}, large enough to produce a shock front in the cluster's interstellar medium.

=== Radio source ===
The radio source in 3C 348 is considered powerful. It is double-lobed with striking bizarre features such as a double optical core and radio intensity rings clustered together inside one of the host galaxy's two radio lobes. Despite not being a Fanaroff-Riley Class II neither an FR I source, it instead shows similarities to both types.

== See also ==
- List of largest galaxies
