= NGC 5419 =

Galaxy in the constellation Centaurus

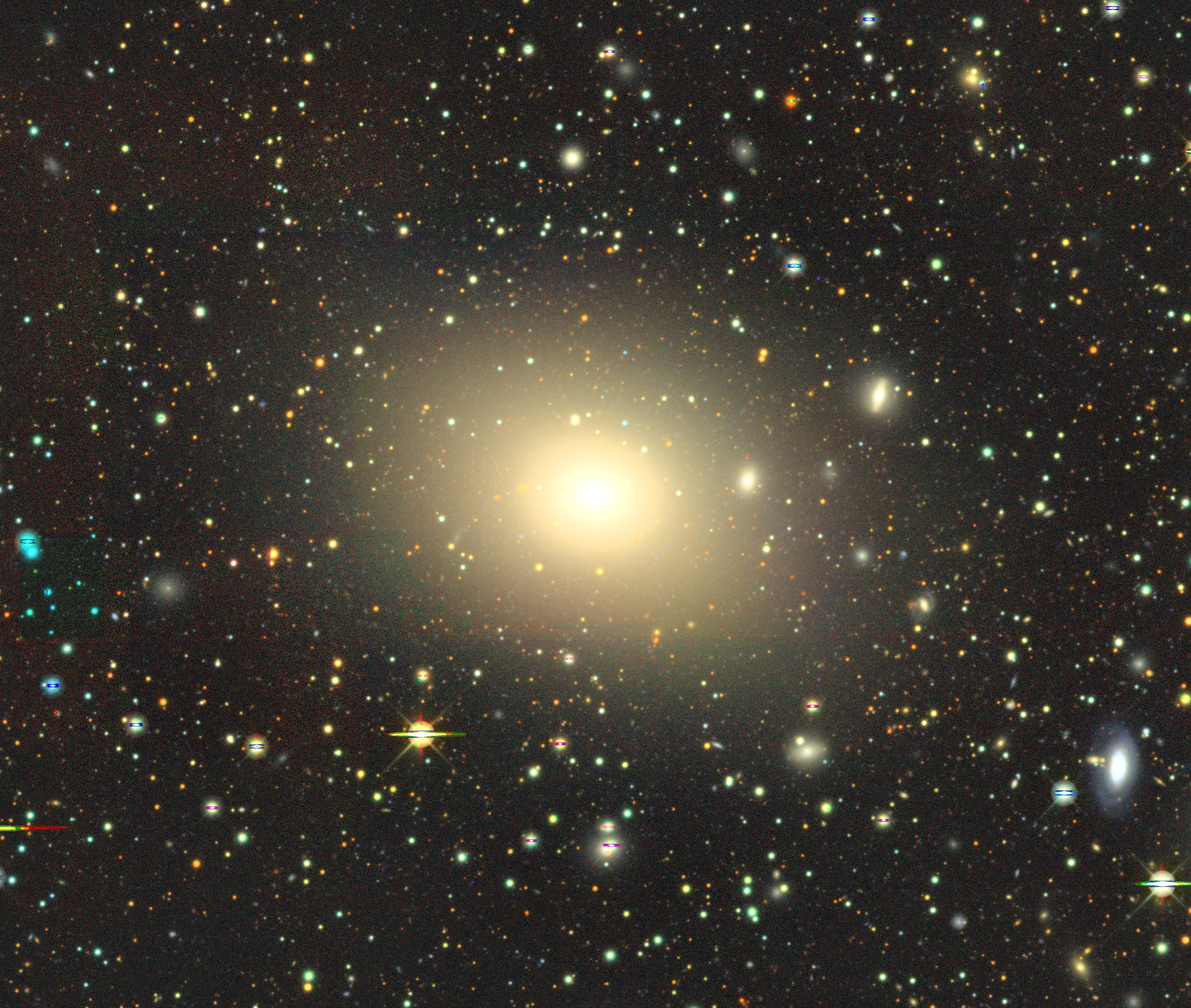
- NGC 5419 imaged by Legacy Surveys

Observation data (J2000 epoch)
- Constellation: Centaurus
- Right ascension: 14^{h} 03^{m} 38.7349^{s}
- Declination: −33° 58′ 41.809″
- Redshift: 0.013763
- Heliocentric radial velocity: 4126 ± 15 km/s
- Distance: 210.5 ± 14.8 Mly (64.53 ± 4.54 Mpc)
- Group or cluster: NGC 5488 Group (LGG 369)
- Apparent magnitude (V): 10.8

Characteristics
- Type: E
- Size: ~428,600 ly (131.42 kpc) (estimated)
- Apparent size (V): 4.1′ × 3.3′

Other designations
- 2MASX J14033877-3358422, MCG -06-31-019, PGC 50100, ESO 384- G 039

NGC 5419 is a large elliptical galaxy in the constellation of Centaurus. Its velocity with respect to the cosmic microwave background is 4,375 ± 23 km/s, which corresponds to a Hubble distance of 64.5 ± 4.5 Mpc (~210 million light-years). It was discovered by British astronomer John Herschel on 1 May 1834.

NGC 5419 is the brightest cluster galaxy of the galaxy cluster, Abell S0753. It contains a large core with a radius span of 1.58 arcsec (≈55 pc). In addition, it has a double nucleus, indicating the presence of two supermassive black holes in the center with a separation gap of only ≈70 pc.

== NGC 5488 Group ==
According to A.M. Garcia, the galaxy NGC 5419 is part of the NGC 5488 group (also known as LGG 369). This group of galaxies has 14 members: NGC 5397, NGC 5488, IC 4366, and nine galaxies from the ESO catalog.

== Supernovae ==
Two supernovae have been observed in NGC 5419:

- SN 2018zz (Type Ia, mag. 16) was discovered by the All Sky Automated Survey for SuperNovae (ASAS-SN) on 3 March 2018.
- SN 2020alh (Type Ia, mag. 15.304) was discovered by ATLAS on 19 January 2020.

== See also ==
- List of NGC objects (5001–6000)
