= 3C 244.1 =

Galaxy in the constellation Ursa Major

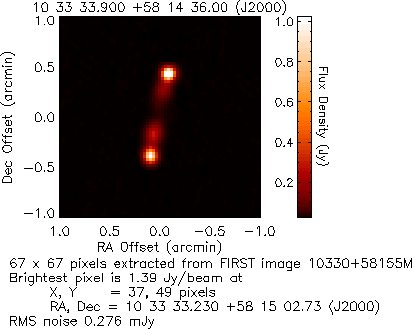

Observation data (Epoch J2000)
- Constellation: Ursa Major
- Right ascension: 10^{h} 33^{m} 33.90^{s}
- Declination: +58° 14′ 36.0″
- Redshift: 0.43
- Type
- Apparent magnitude (V): 19

Other designations
- Ursa Major B, DA 287, LEDA 2821461, 3C 244.1, 4C 58.21.

Ursa Major B or 3C 244.1 is a radio galaxy located in the constellation Ursa Major.

It is classified as a Fanaroff-Riley Type II (FRII) radio source, which means that the luminosity increases with distance from the core. There are two, asymmetrical radio-emitting lobes straddling the parent galaxy. These lobes have an angular separation of 52″ at a position angle of 168°. When measured in the optical band, this galaxy has a redshift value of z = 0.428, corresponding to a distance of 1.5 Gpc. 3C 244.1 is located within a cluster of other galaxies.

Observations with the Hubble Space Telescope show an elliptical galaxy with blobs and a filamentary structure. The radio jets being generated by the active galactic nucleus are interacting with the interstellar medium, producing extended narrow line regions. These features are commonly associated with many active galaxies. The axial ratio of the elliptical galaxy is 1.4, meaning it is about 1.4 times large along the primary axis than along the perpendicular axis.

At the nucleus of this galaxy is a supermassive black hole with an estimated (9.5 ± 6.6) × 10^{8} solar masses. The dimensionless ratio of the black hole spin to the black hole mass-energy j is 0.12 ± 0.04.

== See also ==
- Lists of galaxies
