= Elliptical galaxy =

Spherical or ovoid mass of stars

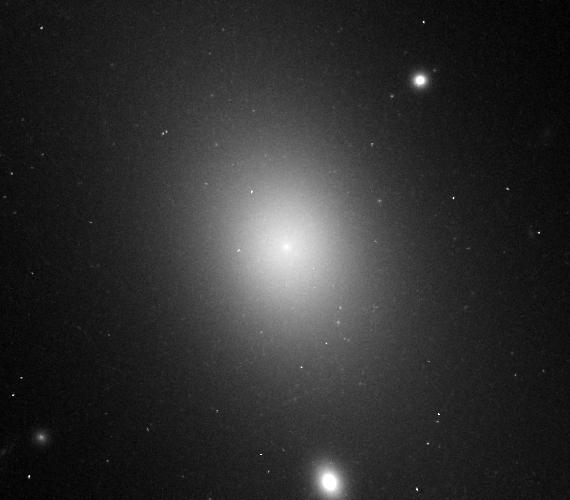
The large elliptical galaxy IC 1101

An elliptical galaxy is a type of galaxy with an approximately ellipsoidal shape and a smooth, nearly featureless image. They are one of the three main classes of galaxy described by Edwin Hubble in his Hubble sequence and 1936 work The Realm of the Nebulae, along with spiral and lenticular galaxies. Elliptical (E) galaxies are, together with lenticular galaxies (S0) with their large-scale disks, and ES galaxies with their intermediate scale disks, a subset of the "early-type" galaxy population.

Most elliptical galaxies are composed of older, low-mass stars, with a sparse interstellar medium, and they tend to be surrounded by large numbers of globular clusters. Star formation activity in elliptical galaxies is typically minimal; they may, however, undergo brief periods of star formation when merging with other galaxies. Elliptical galaxies are believed to make up approximately 10–15% of galaxies in the Virgo Supercluster, and they are not the dominant type of galaxy in the universe overall. They are preferentially found close to the centers of galaxy clusters.

Elliptical galaxies range in size from dwarf ellipticals with tens of millions of stars, to supergiants of over one hundred trillion stars that dominate their galaxy clusters. Originally, Edwin Hubble hypothesized that elliptical galaxies evolved into spiral galaxies, which was later discovered to be false, although the accretion of gas and smaller galaxies may build a disk around a pre-existing ellipsoidal structure. Stars found inside of elliptical galaxies are on average much older than stars found in spiral galaxies.

== Examples ==
- 3C 244.1
- q21M49 (NGC 447
- M59 (NGC 4621)
- M60 (NGC 4649)
- M87 (NGC 4486), whose supermassive black hole was the first black hole to be imaged by the Event Horizon Telescope.
- M89 (NGC 4552)
- M105 (NGC 3379)
- NGC 4697, part of the NGC 4697 Group
- ESO 383-76, one of the largest galaxies known.
- IC 1101, the central galaxy of Abell 2029
- Hercules A, supergiant elliptical galaxy
- Maffei 1, the closest giant elliptical galaxy
- CGCG 049-033, known for having the longest galactic jet discovered
- Centaurus A (NGC 5128), an elliptical/lenticular radio galaxy with peculiar morphology and unusual dust lanes
- NeVe 1, the source of the Ophiuchus Supercluster eruption, the most powerful astronomical event known
- M86 (4406) an elliptical or lenticular galaxy in the constellation Virgo

== General characteristics ==
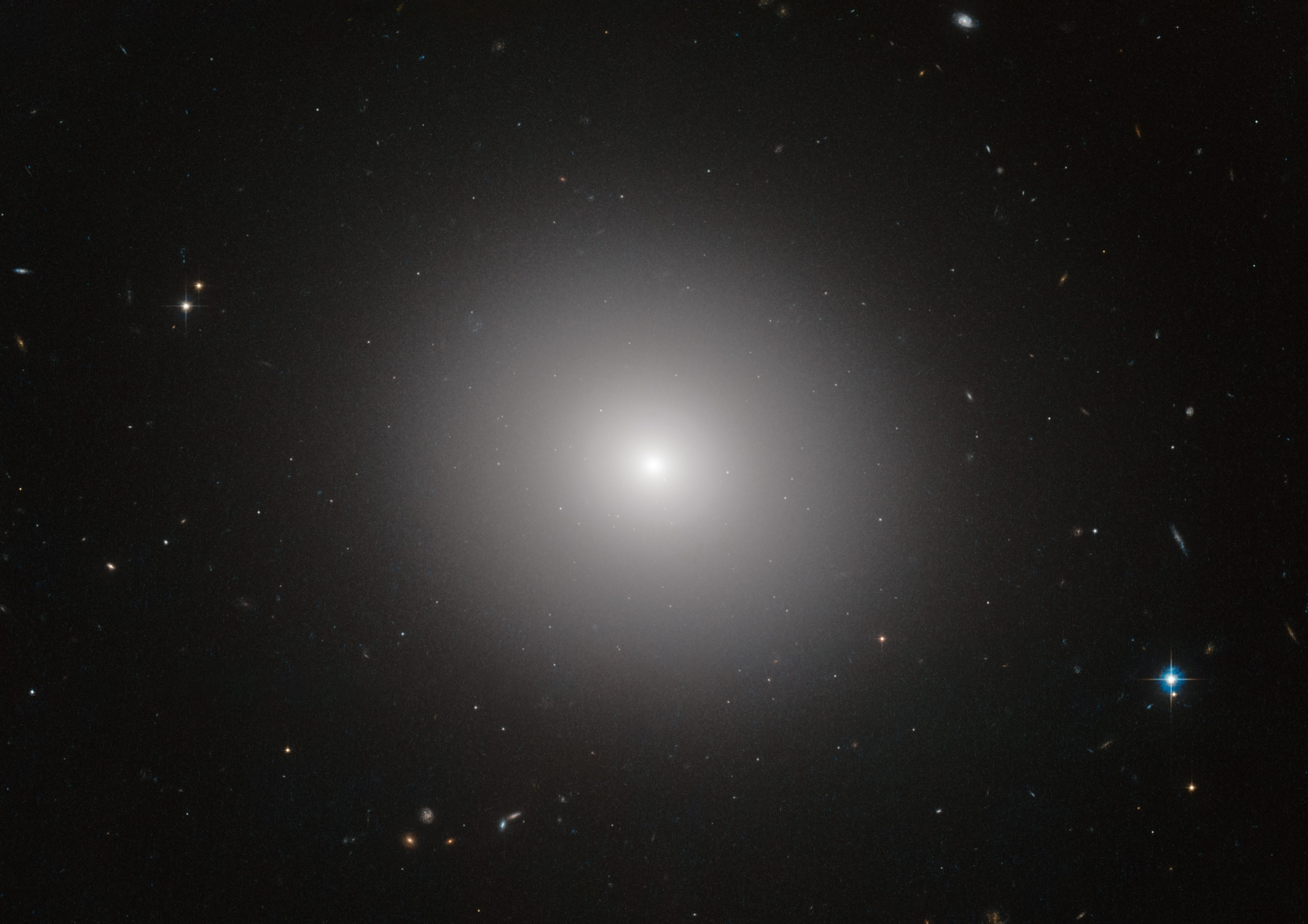
Elliptical galaxy IC 2006

Elliptical galaxies are characterized by several properties that make them distinct from other classes of galaxy. They are spherical or ovoid masses of stars, starved of star-making gases. Furthermore, there is very little interstellar matter (neither gas nor dust), which results in low rates of star formation, few open star clusters, and few young stars; rather, elliptical galaxies are dominated by old stellar populations, giving them red colors. Large elliptical galaxies typically have an extensive system of globular clusters. They generally have two distinct populations of globular clusters: one that is redder and metal-rich, and another that is bluer and metal-poor.

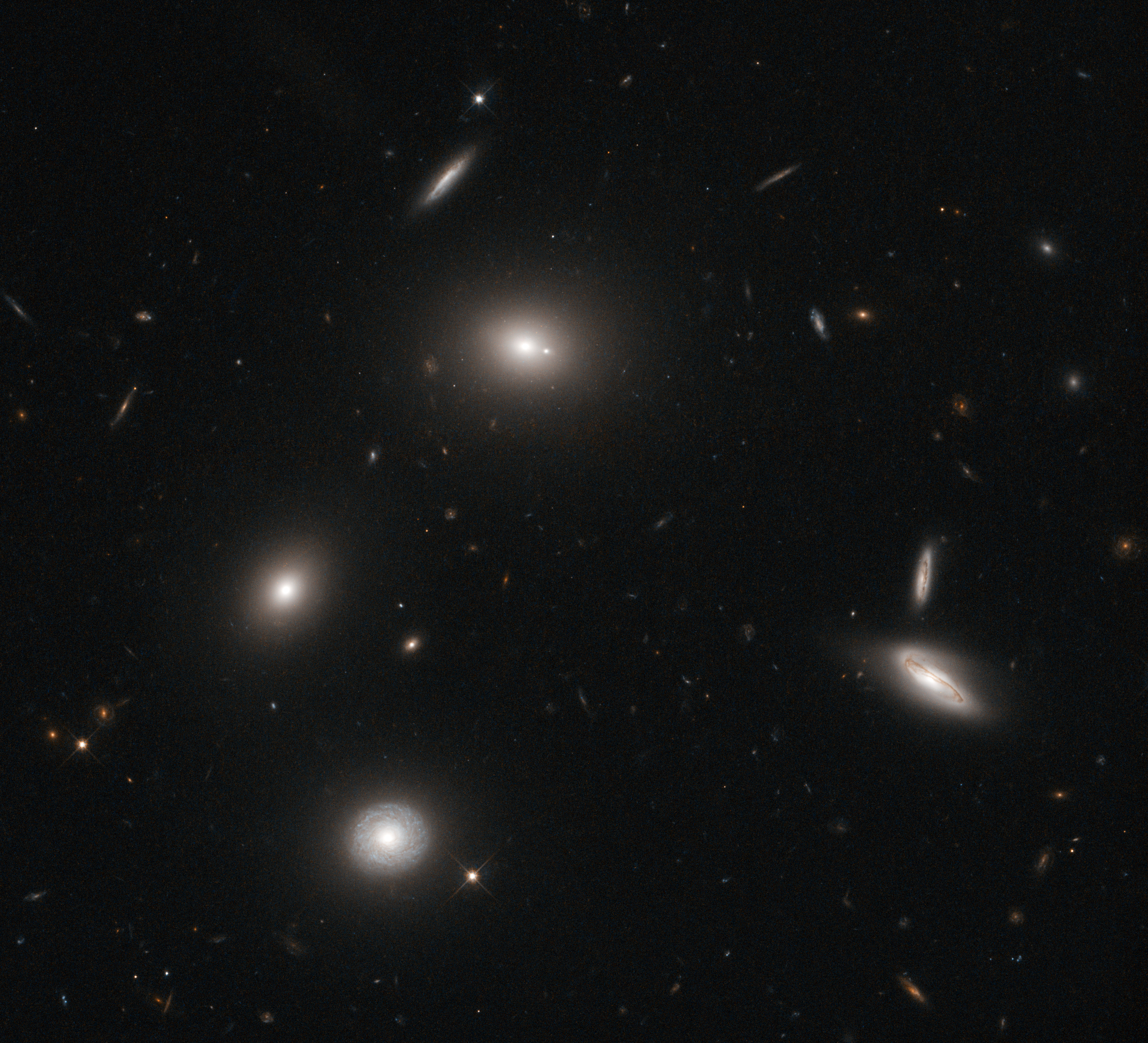
The galaxy located in the image is 4C 73.08, a giant elliptical galaxy.

The dynamical properties of elliptical galaxies and the bulges of disk galaxies are similar, suggesting that they may be formed by the same physical processes, although this remains controversial. The luminosity profiles of both elliptical galaxies and bulges are well fit by Sersic's law, and a range of scaling relations between the elliptical galaxies' structural parameters unify the population.

Every massive elliptical galaxy contains a supermassive black hole at its center. Observations of 46 elliptical galaxies, 20 classical bulges, and 22 pseudobulges show that each contain a black hole at the center. The mass of the black hole is tightly correlated with the mass of the galaxy, evidenced through correlations such as the M–sigma relation which relates the velocity dispersion of the surrounding stars to the mass of the black hole at the center.

Elliptical galaxies are preferentially found in galaxy clusters and in compact groups of galaxies.

Unlike flat spiral galaxies with organization and structure, elliptical galaxies are more three-dimensional, without much structure, and their stars are in somewhat random orbits around the center.

== Sizes and shapes ==
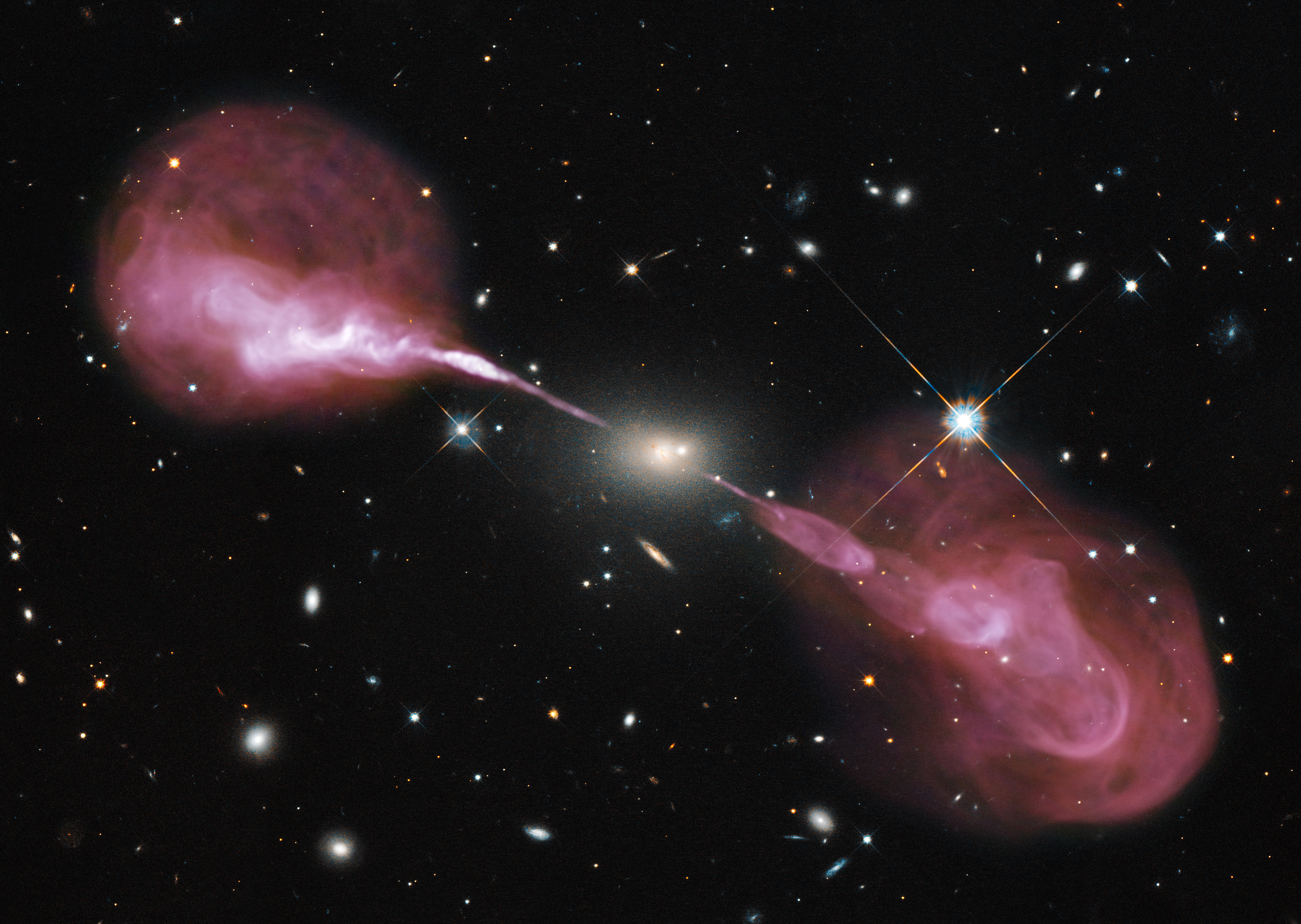
Hercules A, a supergiant elliptical galaxy and also a radio galaxy. The radio lobes shown here in pink are over a million light-years across.

The largest galaxies are supergiant ellipticals, or type-cD galaxies. Elliptical galaxies vary greatly in both size and mass with diameters ranging from 3,000 light years to more than 700,000 light years, and masses from 10^{5} to nearly 10^{13} solar masses. This range is much broader for this galaxy type than for any other. The smallest, the dwarf elliptical galaxies, may be no larger than a typical globular cluster, but contain a considerable amount of dark matter not present in clusters. Most of these small galaxies may not be related to other ellipticals.

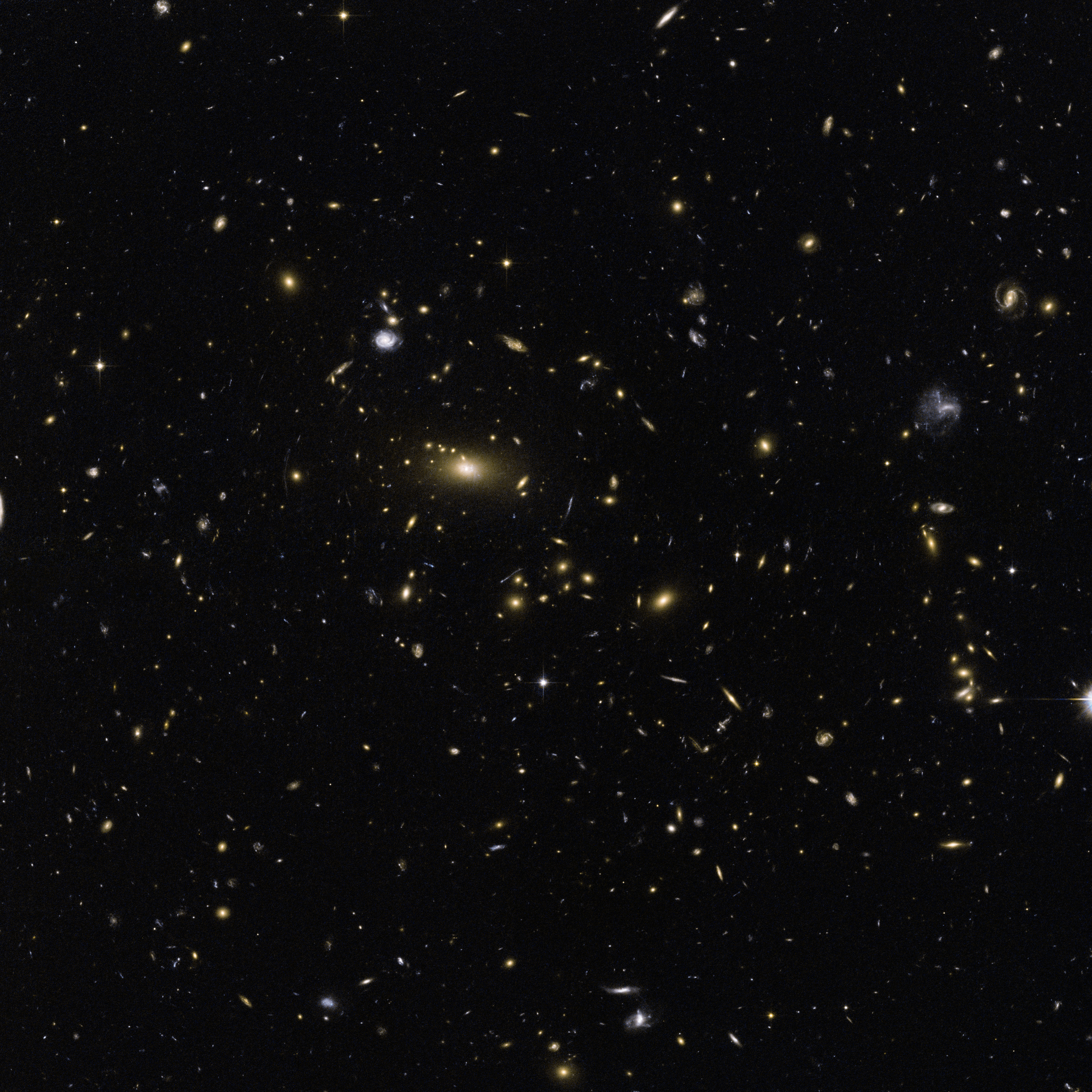
The brilliant central object is the supergiant elliptical galaxy SDSS J142347.87+240442.4, the dominant member of the galaxy cluster MACS J1423.8+2404. It has a diameter of 380,000 light-years. Note the gravitational lensing.

The Hubble classification of elliptical galaxies contains an integer that describes how elongated the galaxy image is. The classification is determined by the ratio of the major (a) to the minor (b) axes of the galaxy's isophotes:

$$10 \times \left(1 - \frac{b}{a}\right)$$

Thus for a spherical galaxy with a equal to b, the number is 0, and the Hubble type is E0. While the limit in the literature is about E7, it has been known since 1966 that the E4 to E7 galaxies are misclassified lenticular galaxies with disks inclined at different angles to our line of sight. This has been confirmed through spectral observations revealing the rotation of their stellar disks. Hubble recognized that his shape classification depends both on the intrinsic shape of the galaxy, as well as the angle with which the galaxy is observed. Hence, some galaxies with Hubble type E0 are actually elongated.

It is sometimes said that there are two physical types of ellipticals: the giant ellipticals with slightly "boxy"-shaped isophotes, whose shapes result from random motion which is greater in some directions than in others (anisotropic random motion); and the "disky" normal and dwarf ellipticals, which contain disks. This is, however, an abuse of the nomenclature, as there are two types of early-type galaxy, those with disks and those without. Given the existence of ES galaxies with intermediate-scale disks, it is reasonable to expect that there is a continuity from E to ES, and onto the S0 galaxies with their large-scale stellar disks that dominate the light at large radii.

Dwarf spheroidal galaxies appear to be a distinct class: their properties are more similar to those of irregulars and late spiral-type galaxies.

At the large end of the elliptical spectrum, there is further division, beyond Hubble's classification. Beyond gE giant ellipticals, lies D-galaxies and cD-galaxies. These are similar to their smaller brethren, but more diffuse, with large haloes that may as much belong to the galaxy cluster within which they reside than the centrally located giant galaxy.

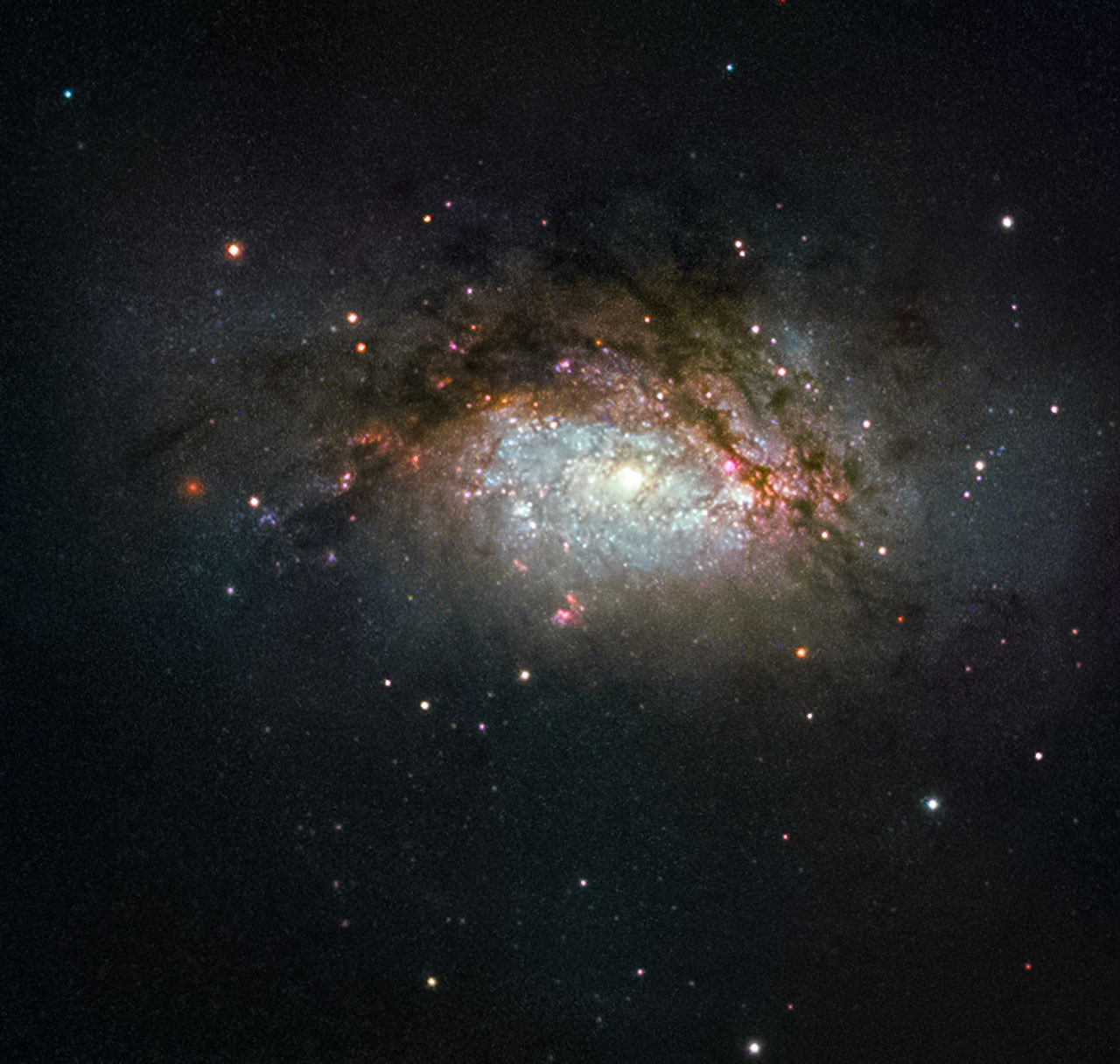
NGC 3597 is the product of a collision between two galaxies. It is evolving into a giant elliptical galaxy.

== Formation and evolution ==
The formation of elliptical galaxies is an active area of ongoing research. Early models proposed formation through rapid star formation at high redshifts, while later models emphasize formation through mergers of disk galaxies. Studies show that both models are consistent with what is plausible for their formation.

More recent work suggests that gas-rich (wet) mergers can produce lower mass, fast rotating ellipticals, while gas-poor (dry) mergers may help build higher mass, slow rotating systems. Nearby ellipticals have shown more massive systems are typically older. Some elliptical galaxies also contain dust lanes, which can be a feature that has been interpreted as evidence of being a merger.

Elliptical galaxies that are more massive and found in denser environments such as clusters tend to be older, redder, and more metal rich.

== Star formation ==
In recent years, evidence has shown that a reasonable proportion (~25%) of early-type (E, ES and S0) galaxies have residual gas reservoirs and low-level star formation.

Herschel Space Observatory researchers have speculated that the central black holes in elliptical galaxies keep the gas from cooling enough for star formation.

== See also ==
- Firehose instability
- Fundamental plane (elliptical galaxies)
- Galaxy color–magnitude diagram
- Galaxy morphological classification
- Hubble sequence
- Lenticular galaxy
- Osipkov–Merritt model
- Sersic profile
