= Astrophysical jet =

Stream of ionized matter flowing away from a rotating astronomical object

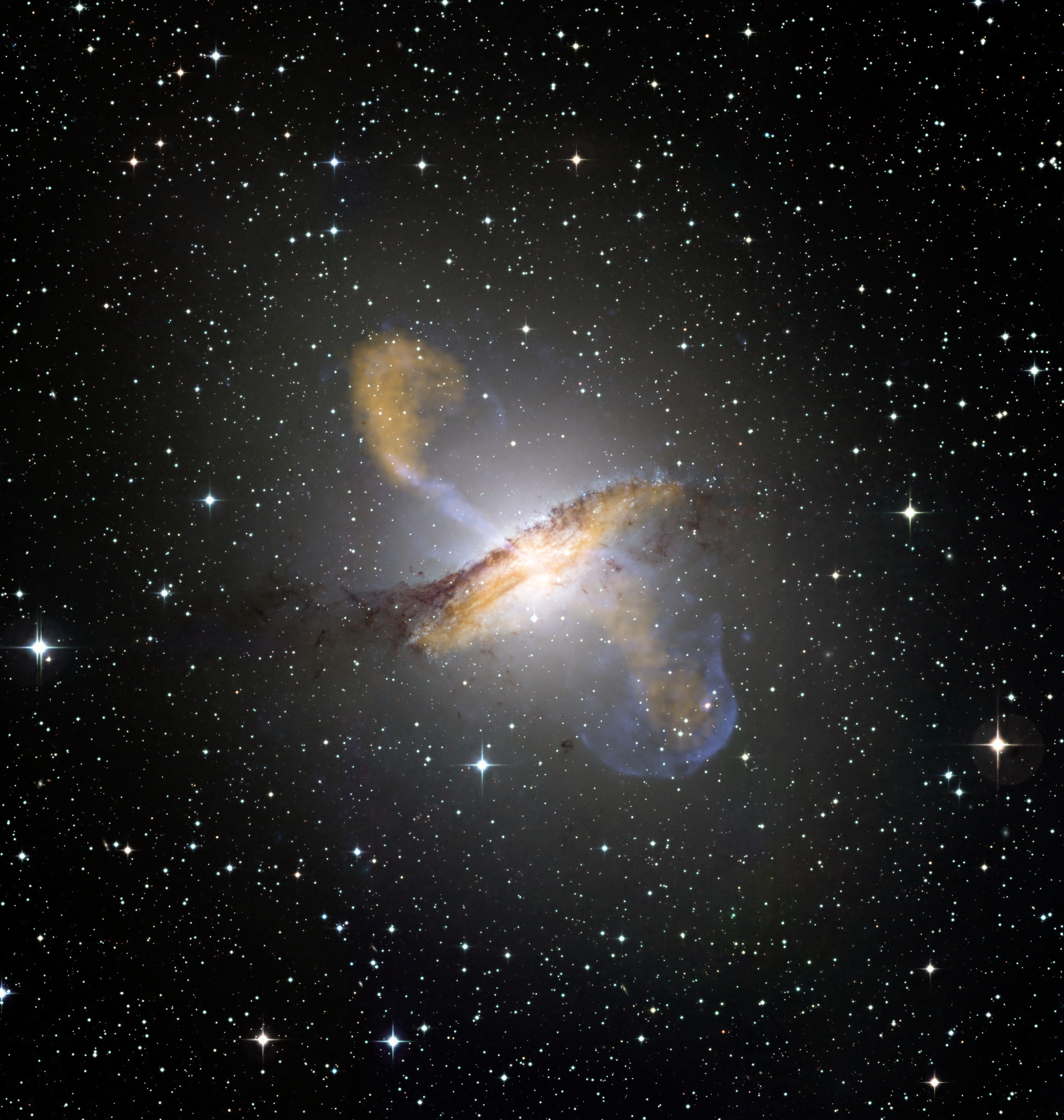
The starburst galaxy Centaurus A, with its plasma jets extending over a million light years, is considered as the closest active radio galaxy to Earth. The 870-micron submillimetre data, from LABOCA on APEX, are shown in orange. X-ray data from the Chandra X-ray Observatory are shown in blue. Visible light data from the Wide Field Imager (WFI) on the MPG/ESO 2.2 m telescope located at La Silla, Chile, show the background stars and the galaxy's characteristic dust lane in close to "true colour".

An astrophysical jet is an astronomical phenomenon where ionised matter is expelled at high velocity from an astronomical object, in a pair of narrow streams in opposite directions, aligned with the object's axis of rotation. When the matter in these streams is flowing at close to the speed of light, the jet is referred to as a relativistic jet, as it demonstrates phenomena predicted by special relativity.

Astrophysical jets are associated with many types of high-energy astronomical sources, such as black holes, neutron stars and pulsars. Their causes are not yet fully understood, but they are believed to arise from dynamic interactions within accretion disks. One explanation is that as an accretion disk spins, it generates a rotating, tangled magnetic field which concentrates material from the disk into the jets and then drives it away from the central object. Jets may also be influenced by a general relativity effect known as frame-dragging.

Most of the largest and most active jets are created by supermassive black holes (SMBH) in the centre of active galaxies such as quasars and radio galaxies or within galaxy clusters. Such jets can exceed millions of parsecs in length. Other astronomical objects that produce, or are caused by, jets include cataclysmic variable stars, X-ray binaries and gamma-ray bursts (GRB). Jets on a much smaller scale (~parsecs) may be found in star forming regions, including T Tauri stars and Herbig–Haro objects; these objects are partially formed by the interaction of jets with the interstellar medium. Bipolar outflows may also be associated with protostars, or with evolved post-AGB stars, planetary nebulae and bipolar nebulae.

== Relativistic jets ==
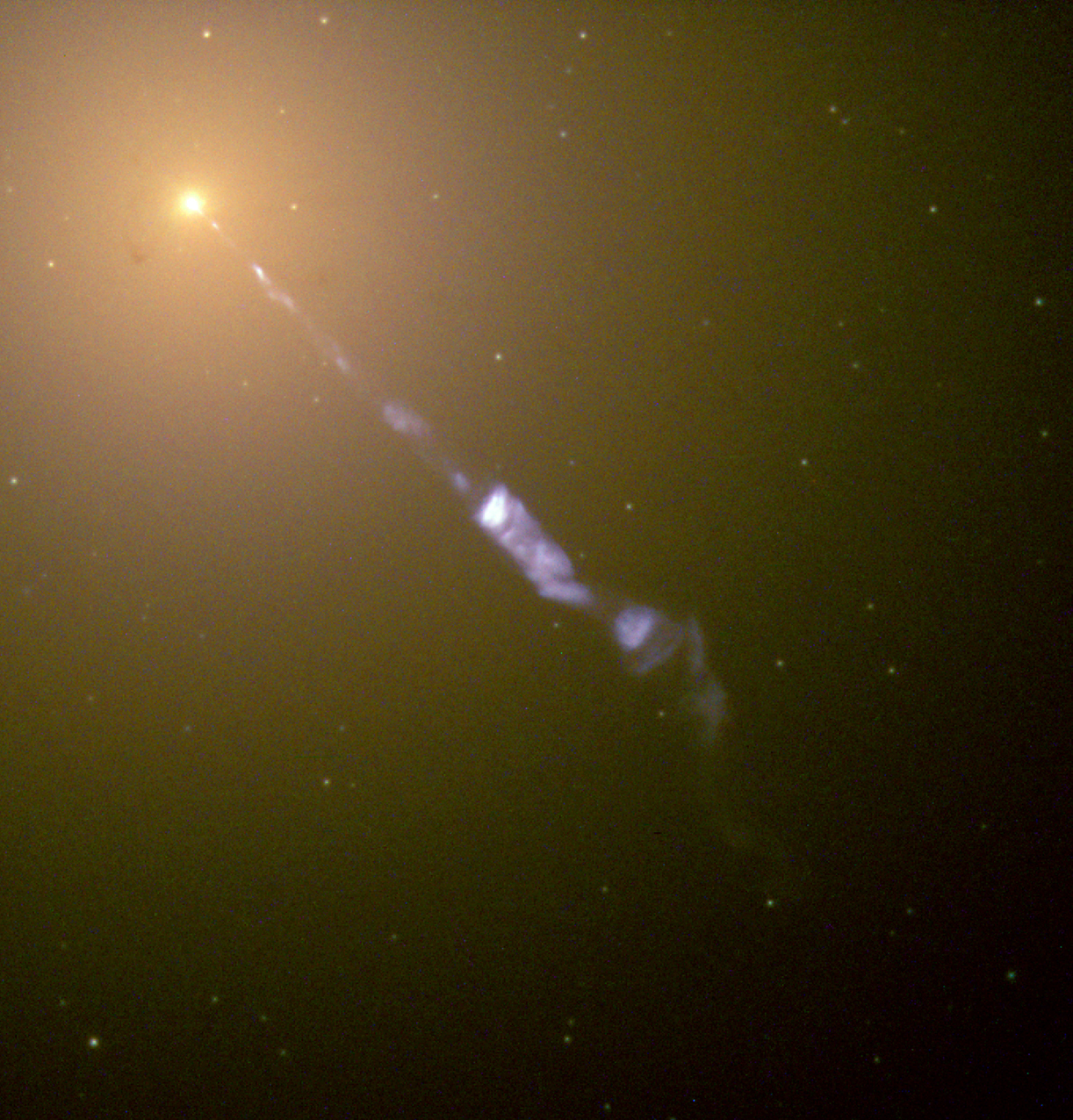
Elliptical galaxy M87 emitting a relativistic jet, as seen by the Hubble Space Telescope

Relativistic jets are beams of ionised matter accelerated close to the speed of light. Most have been observationally associated with central black holes of some active galaxies, radio galaxies or quasars, and also by galactic stellar black holes, neutron stars or pulsars. Beam lengths may extend between several thousand, hundreds of thousands or millions of parsecs. Jet velocities when approaching the speed of light show significant effects of the special theory of relativity; for example, relativistic beaming that changes the apparent beam brightness.

Massive central black holes in galaxies have the most powerful jets, but their structure and behaviours are similar to those of smaller galactic neutron stars and black holes. These systems are often called microquasars and show a large range of velocities. SS 433 jet, for example, has a mean velocity of 0.26c. Relativistic jet formation may also explain observed gamma-ray bursts, which have the most relativistic jets known, being ultrarelativistic.

Mechanisms behind the composition of jets remain uncertain, though some studies favour models where jets are composed of an electrically neutral mixture of nuclei, electrons, and positrons, while others are consistent with jets composed of positron–electron plasma. Trace nuclei swept up in a relativistic positron–electron jet would be expected to have extremely high energy, as these heavier nuclei should attain velocity equal to the positron and electron velocity.

== Rotation as possible energy source ==
Because of the enormous amount of energy needed to launch a relativistic jet, some jets are possibly powered by spinning black holes. However, the frequency of high-energy astrophysical sources with jets suggests combinations of different mechanisms indirectly identified with the energy within the associated accretion disk and X-ray emissions from the generating source. Two early theories have been used to explain how energy can be transferred from a black hole into an astrophysical jet:

- Blandford–Znajek process. This theory explains the extraction of energy from magnetic fields around an accretion disk, which are dragged and twisted by the spin of the black hole. Relativistic material is then feasibly launched by the tightening of the field lines.
- Penrose mechanism. Here energy is extracted from a rotating black hole by frame dragging, which was later theoretically proven by Reva Kay Williams to be able to extract relativistic particle energy and momentum, and subsequently shown to be a possible mechanism for jet formation. This effect includes using general relativistic gravitomagnetism.

== Relativistic jets from neutron stars ==
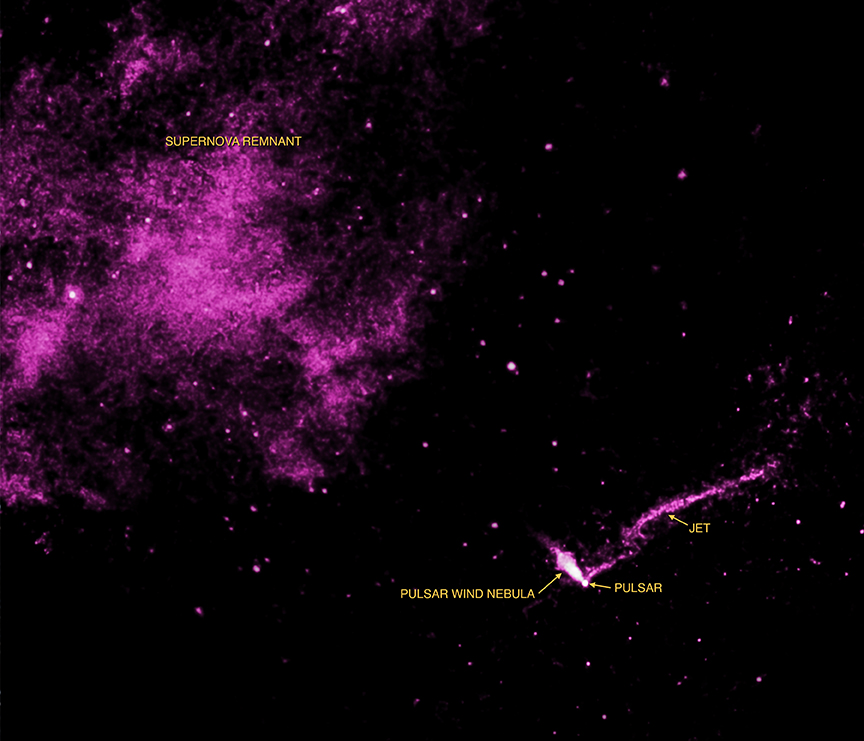
The pulsar IGR J11014-6103 with supernova remnant origin, nebula and jet

Jets may also be observed from spinning neutron stars. An example is pulsar IGR J11014-6103, which has the largest jet so far observed in the Milky Way, and whose velocity is estimated at 80% the speed of light (0.8c). X-ray observations have been obtained, but there is no detected radio signature or accretion disk. Initially, this pulsar was presumed to be rapidly spinning, but later measurements indicate the spin rate is only 15.9 Hz. Such a slow spin rate and lack of accretion material suggest the jet is neither rotation nor accretion powered, though it appears aligned with the pulsar rotation axis and perpendicular to the pulsar's true motion.

== Other images ==
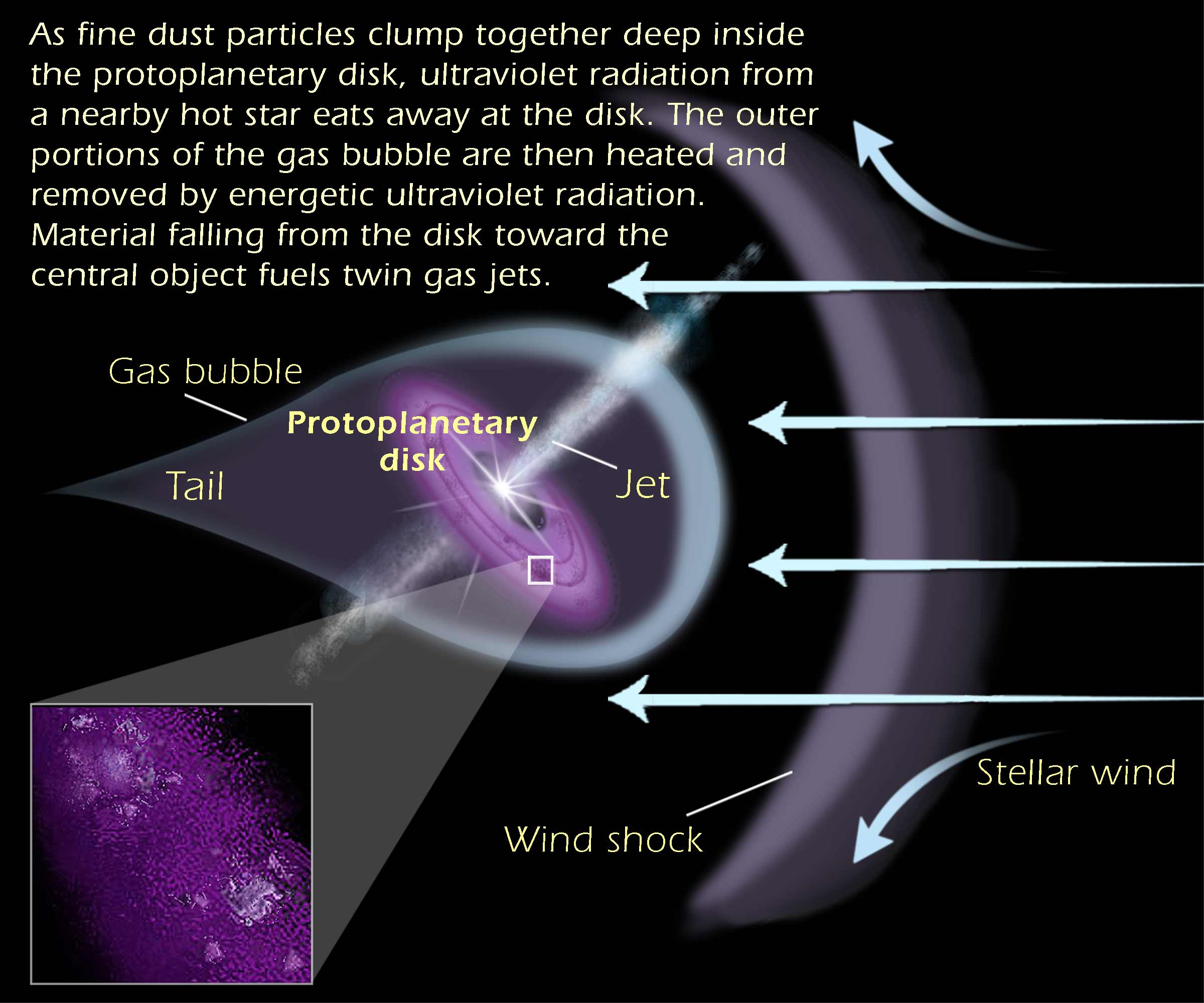
Illustration of the dynamics of a proplyd, including a jet

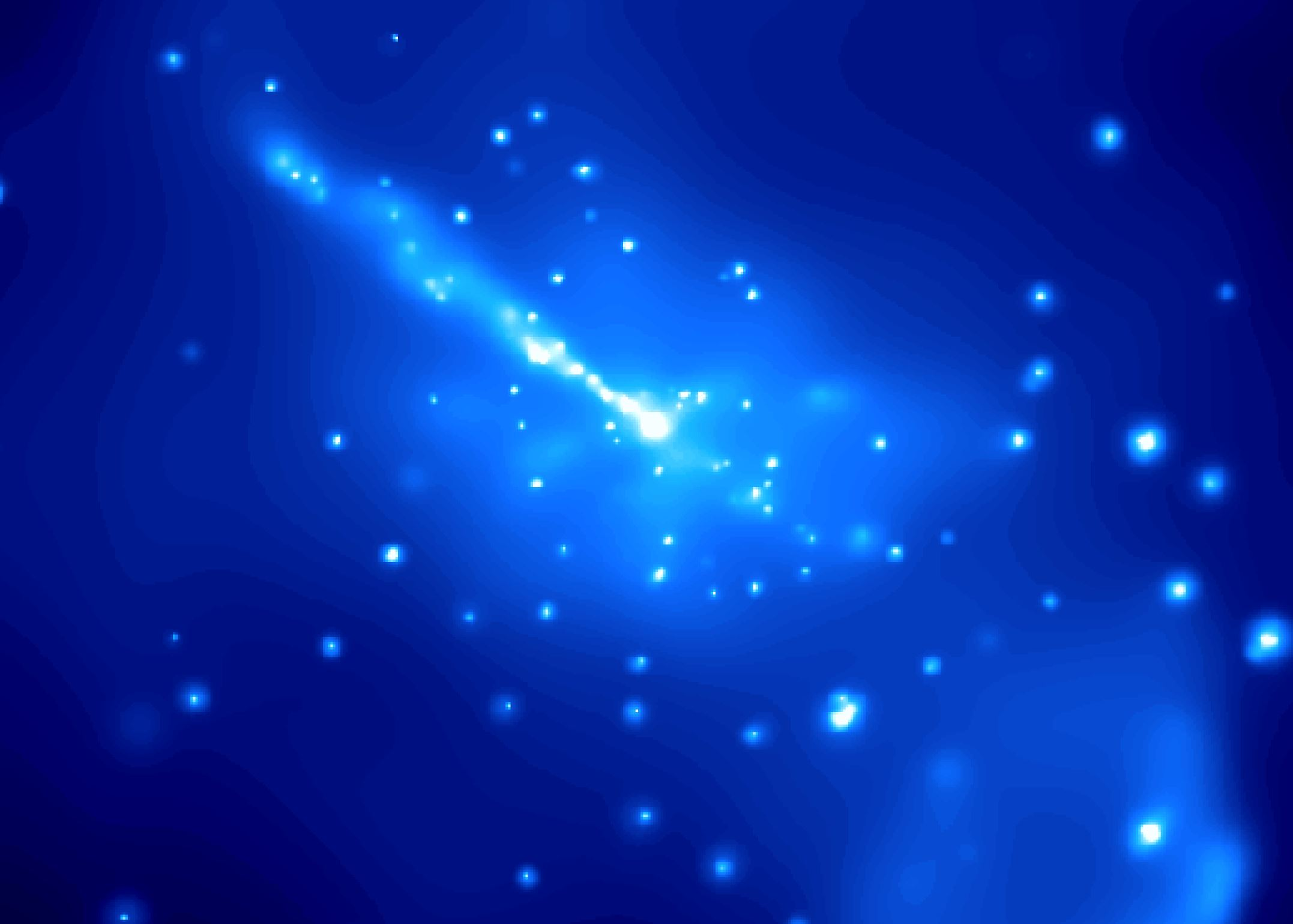
Centaurus A in x-rays showing the relativistic jet

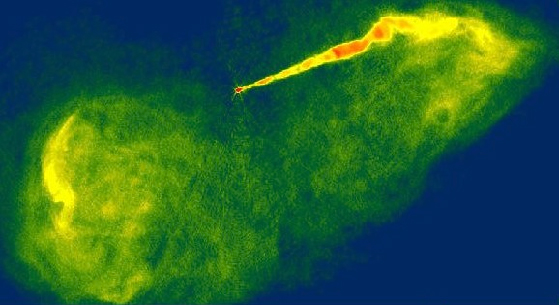
The M87 jet seen by the Very Large Array in radio frequency (the viewing field is larger and rotated with respect to the above image.)

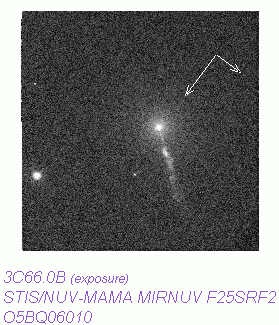
Hubble Legacy Archive Near-UV image of the relativistic jet in 3C 66B

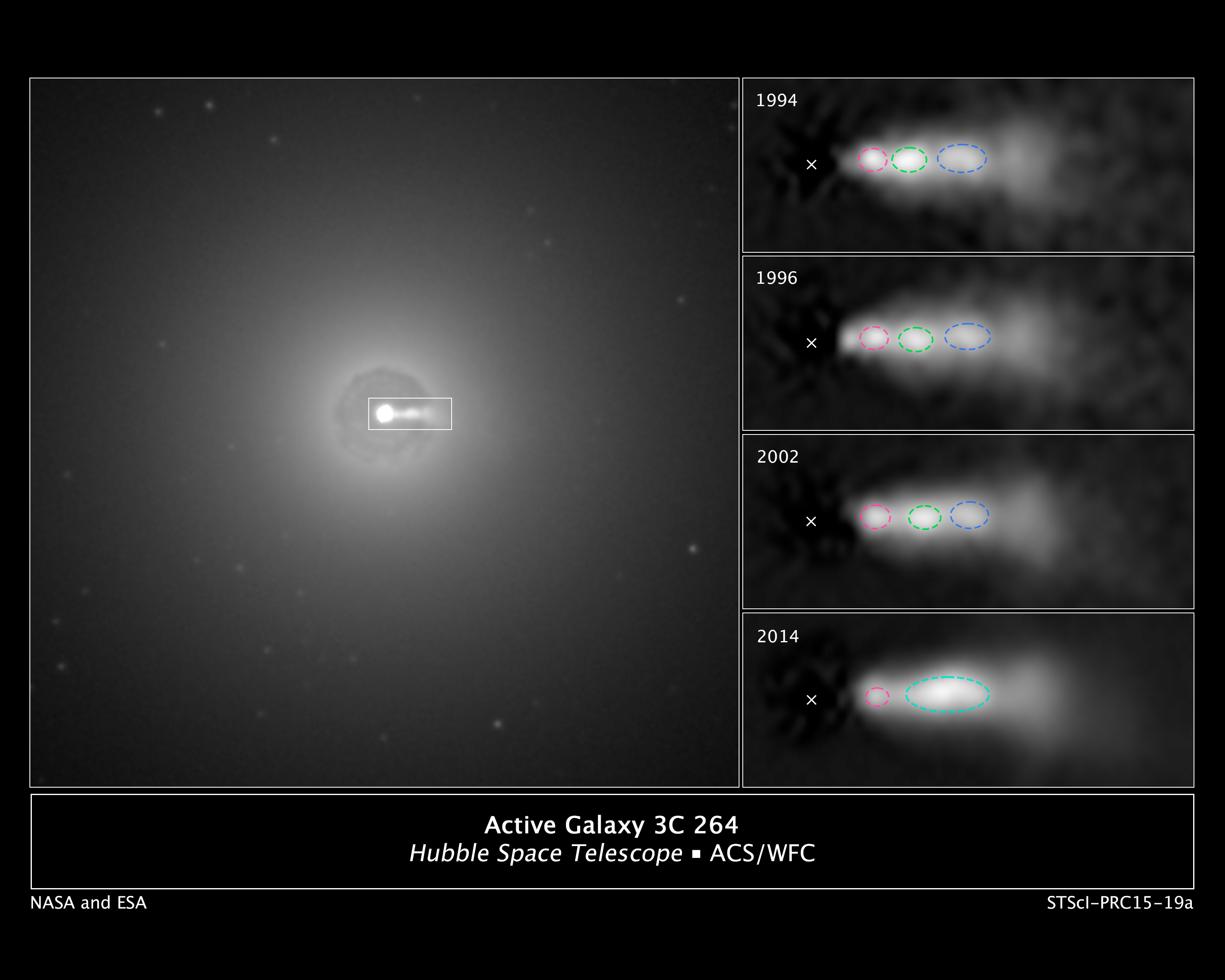
Galaxy NGC 3862, an extragalactic jet of material moving at nearly the speed of light can be seen at the three o'clock position.

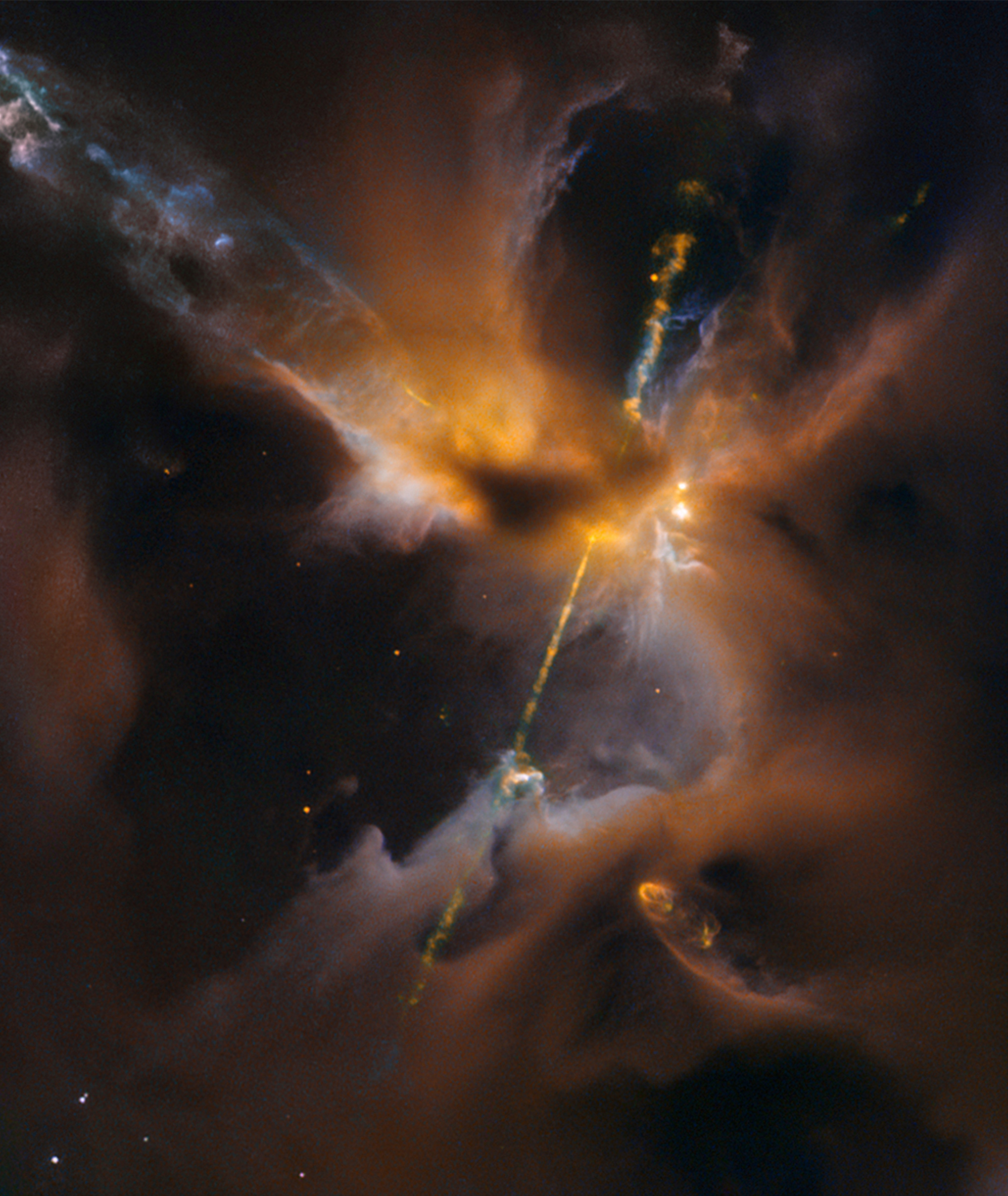
Some of the jets in HH 24-26, which contains the highest concentration of jets known anywhere in the sky

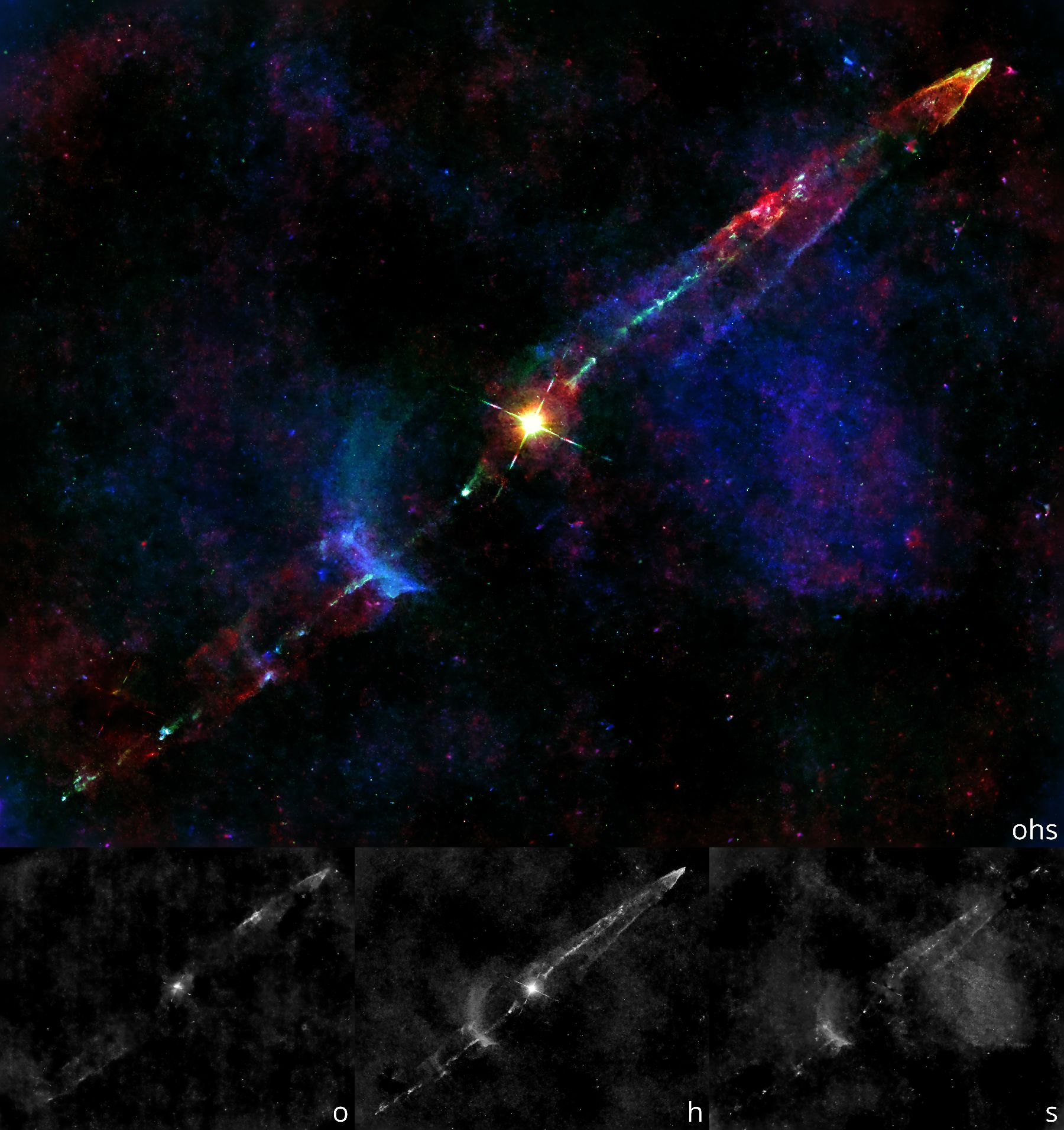
Bipolar jets ejected from the interacting binary star KX Andromedae

== See also ==
- Disk wind slower wide-angle outflow, often occurring together with a jet
- Accretion disk
- Bipolar outflow
- Blandford–Znajek process
- Herbig–Haro object
- Penrose process
- CGCG 049-033, elliptical galaxy located 600 million light-years from Earth, known for having the longest galactic jet discovered
- Gamma-ray burst
- Solar jet
