= NGC 3597 =

Galaxy in the constellation Crater

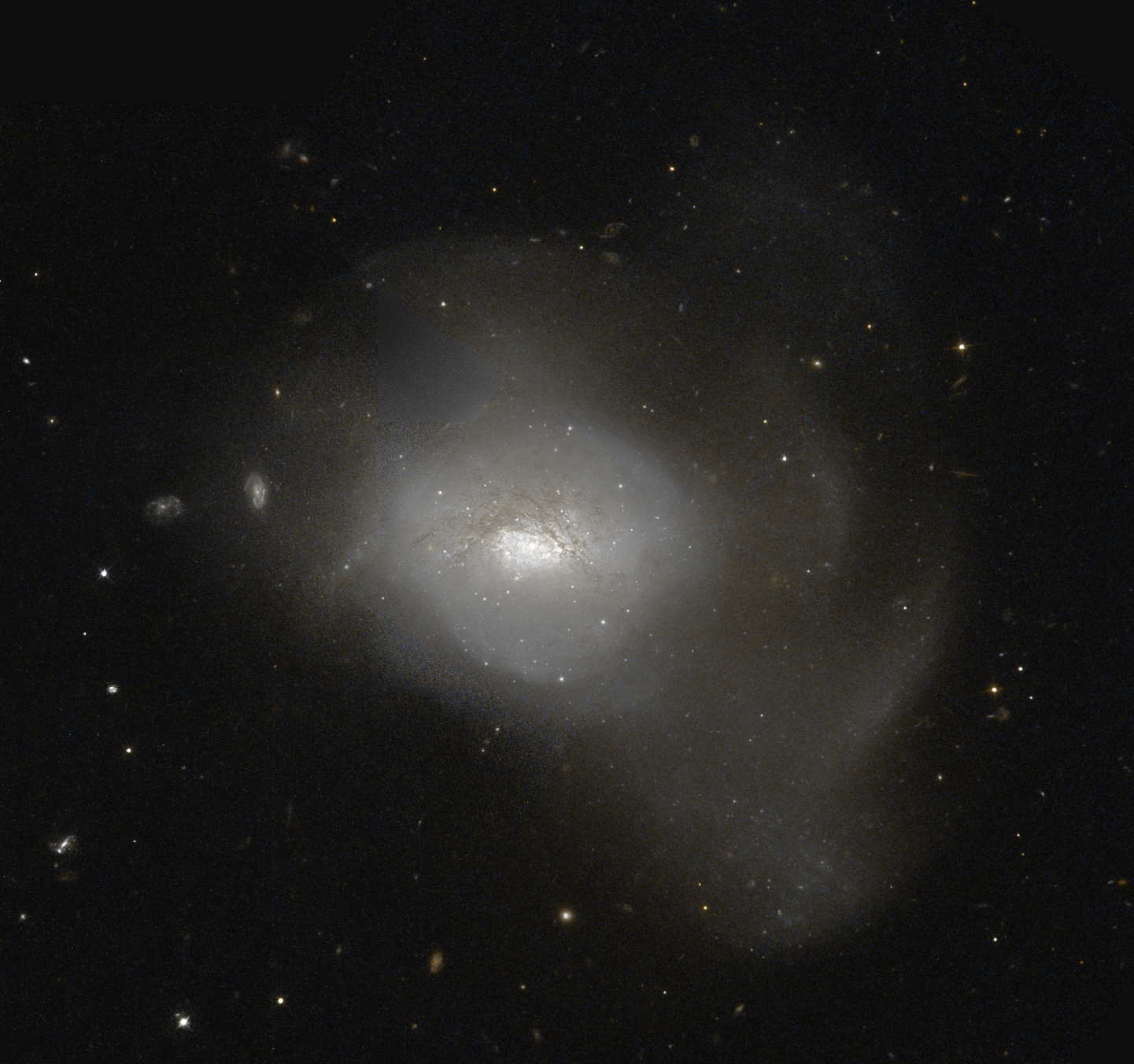
- Hubble Space Telescope image of NGC 3597

Observation data (J2000 epoch)
- Constellation: Crater
- Right ascension: 11^{h} 14^{m} 41.97^{s}
- Declination: −23° 43′ 39.58″
- Redshift: 0.011725
- Heliocentric radial velocity: 3494 km/s
- Distance: 150,000,000 light-years (46,000,000 pc)
- Apparent magnitude (B): 13.62

Characteristics
- Type: S0
- Notable features: Elliptical galaxy in making

Other designations
- FLASH J111441.93-234340, MCG-04-27-005, VVD 11, PGC 34266

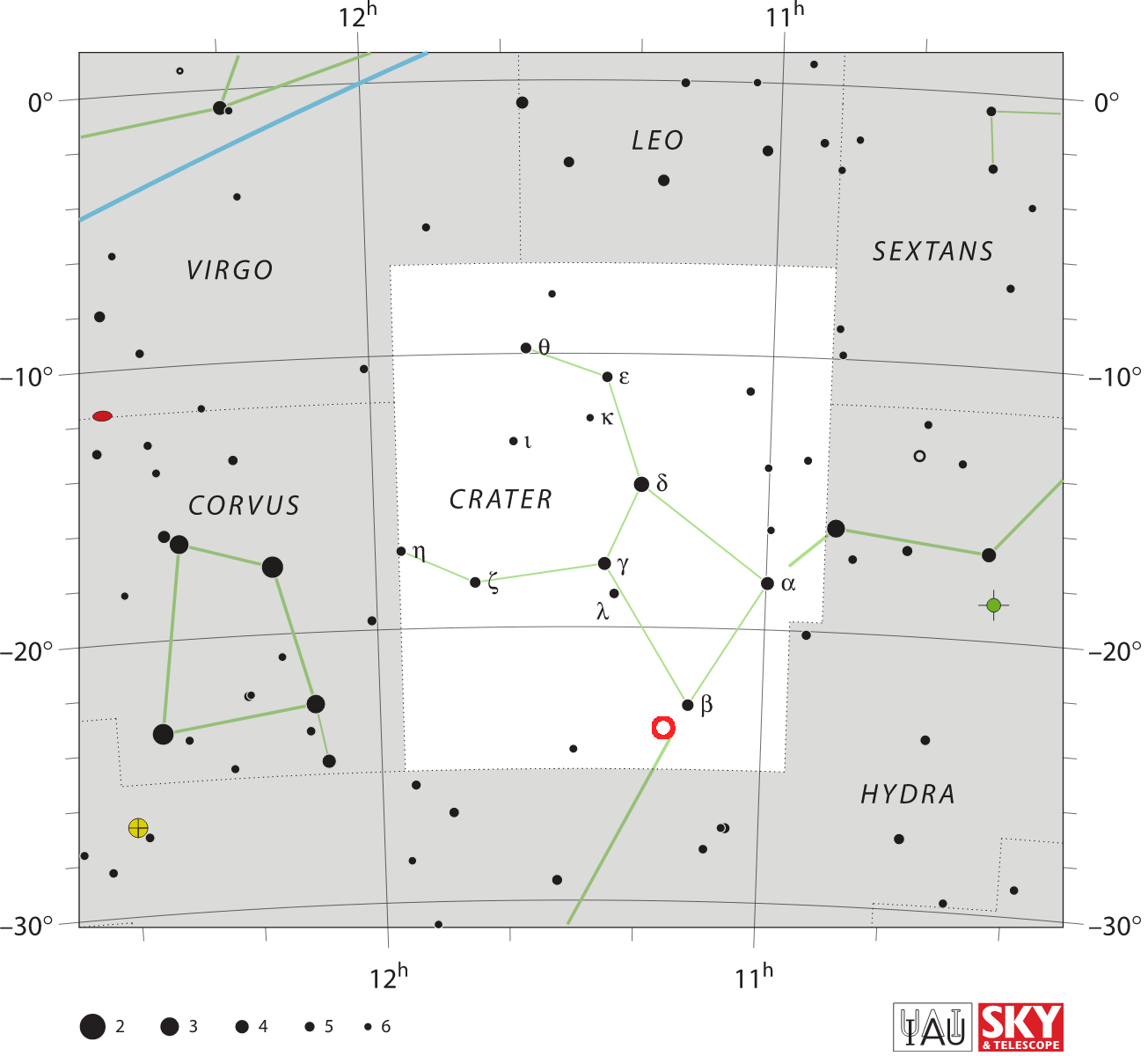
The location of NGC 3597 (circled in red)

NGC 3597 is a galaxy located approximately 150 million light-years away in the constellation of Crater. It was discovered by John Herschel on March 21, 1835.

== Characteristics ==
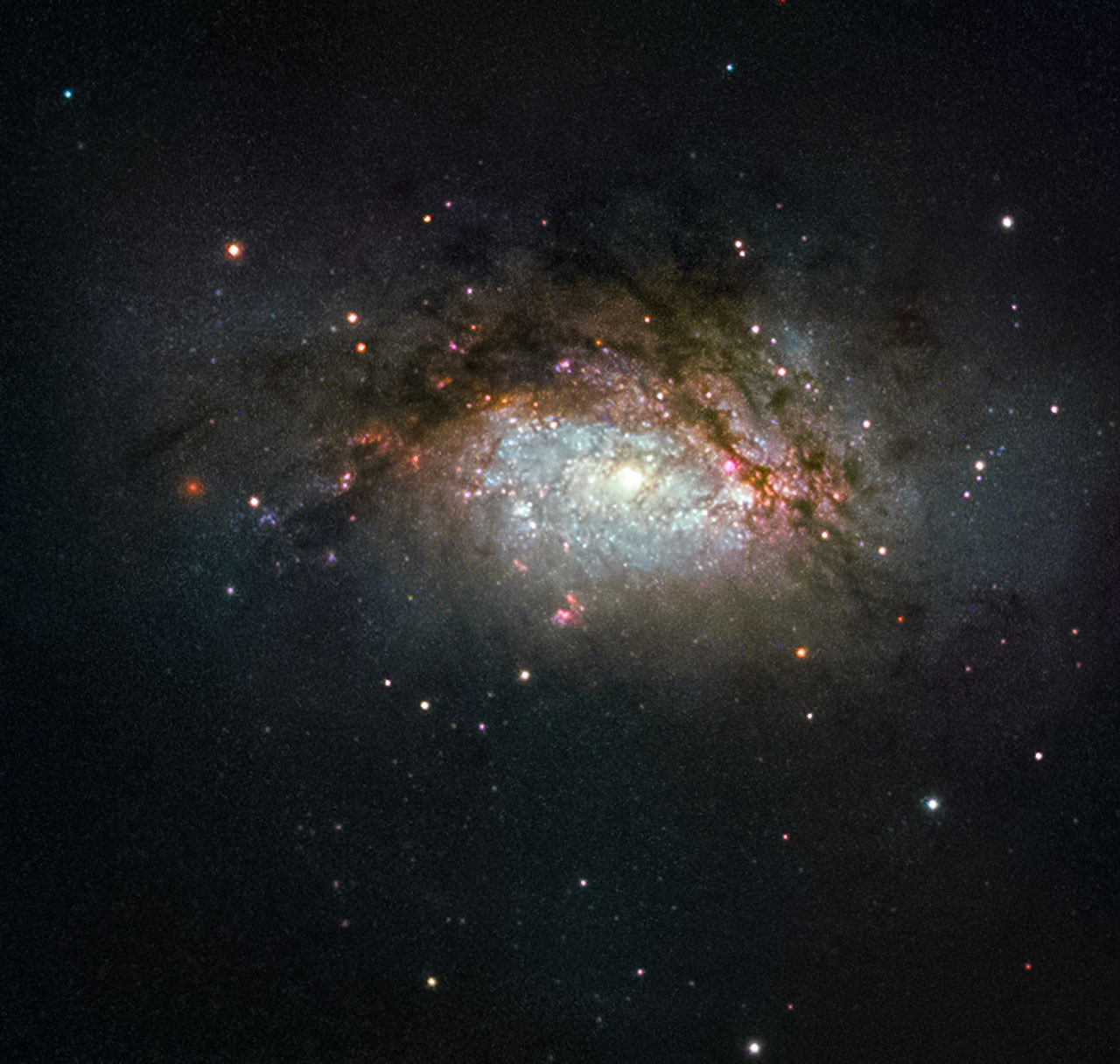
Close view with HST

NGC 3597 is thought to be the product of the collision of two large galaxies, and it appears to be slowly evolving to become an elliptical galaxy. Because of this, NGC 3597 is interesting to astronomers. Galaxies smashing together pool their available gas and dust, triggering new rounds of star birth. Some of this material ends up in dense pockets initially called proto-globular clusters, dozens of which festoon NGC 3597. These pockets will go on to collapse and form globular clusters, packed tightly full of millions of stars.

== See also ==
- Interacting galaxy
