= Abell 2029 =

Large galaxy cluster in the constellation Virgo

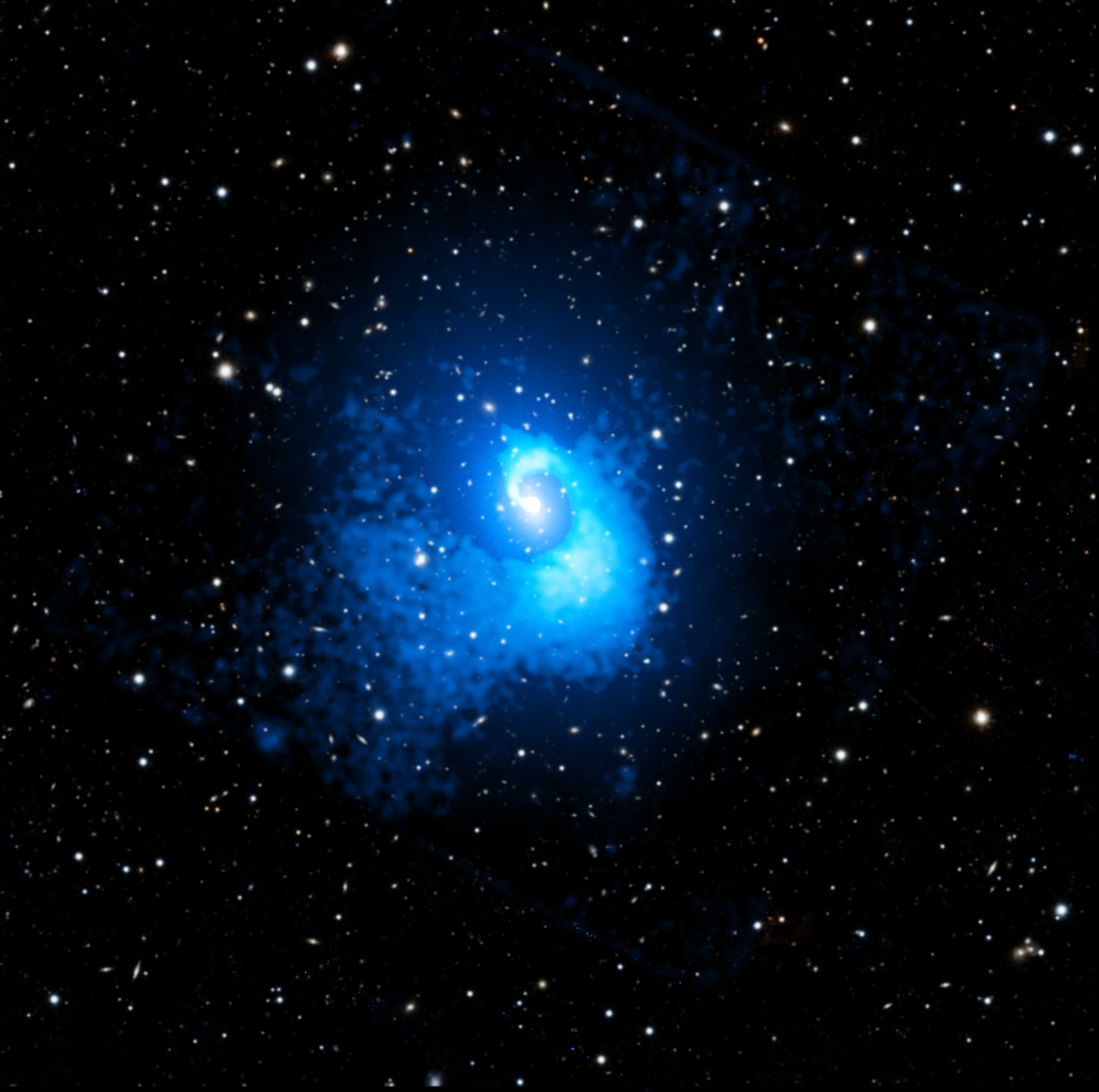
- Abell 2029 imaged by Chandra X-ray Observatory

Observation data (Epoch J2000)
- Constellation: Virgo
- Right ascension: 15^{h} 10^{m} 56.20^{s}
- Declination: +05° 44′ 41″
- Brightest member: IC 1101
- Richness class: 2
- Bautz–Morgan classification: I
- Redshift: 0.0767
- Distance: 326 Mpc (1,063×10^{6} ly) h^{−1}_{0.705}
- ICM temperature: 8.47 keV
- Binding mass: 8×10^{14} M_{☉}
- X-ray flux: 6.94×10^{−11} erg s^{−1} cm^{−2} (0.1–2.4 keV)

Abell 2029 or A2029 is a large and relaxed cluster of galaxies 315 megaparsecs (1.027 billion light-years) away in the constellation Virgo. A2029 is a Bautz–Morgan classification type I cluster due to its large central galaxy, IC 1101. Abell 2029 has a diameter of 5.8–8 million light-years. This type of galaxy is called a cD-type brightest cluster galaxy and may have grown to its large size by accreting nearby galaxies. Despite its relaxed state, it is the central member of a large supercluster which shows clear signs of interaction.
