= Solar jet =

Jet of plasma in the Sun's atmosphere

Polar jets appear as bright spikes in soft X-ray observations by the X-ray Telescope aboard the Hinode spacecraft

Solar jets are transient, collimated flows of plasma in the Sun's atmosphere. They occur at many different scales, temperatures, and locations, and are driven by the release of magnetic energy via magnetic reconnection. The plasma ejected by a solar jet travels away from the Sun along straight or oblique paths, tracing the local magnetic field.

Due to the wide range of temperatures and regions of the solar atmosphere in which jet-like phenomena are observed, solar jets are referred to by many different names. For example, jetting phenomena observed in coronal and chromospheric temperatures are sometimes referred to as coronal jets and chromospheric jets (or chromospheric surges), respectively, and when observed in X-rays, extreme ultraviolet, white light, and Hα are sometimes referred to as X-ray jets, EUV jets, white-light jets, and Hα jets (or Hα surges), respectively. Since ejected plasma from a single event may have a wide range of temperatures, any one event may be referred to by one or more names depending on the waveband or wavebands observed. Additionally, when located in an active region, a quiet-Sun region, a coronal hole, or the Sun's poles, they are sometimes known as active region jets, quiet-Sun jets, coronal hole jets, or polar jets, respectively. Furthermore, some solar jets are classified as macrospicules due to their similarities with the much smaller chromospheric spicules.

Solar jets are sometimes associated with other transient, eruptive phenomena in the Sun's atmosphere—such as solar flares and coronal mass ejections—and have also been associated with impulsive solar particle events.
