= List of largest radio galaxies =

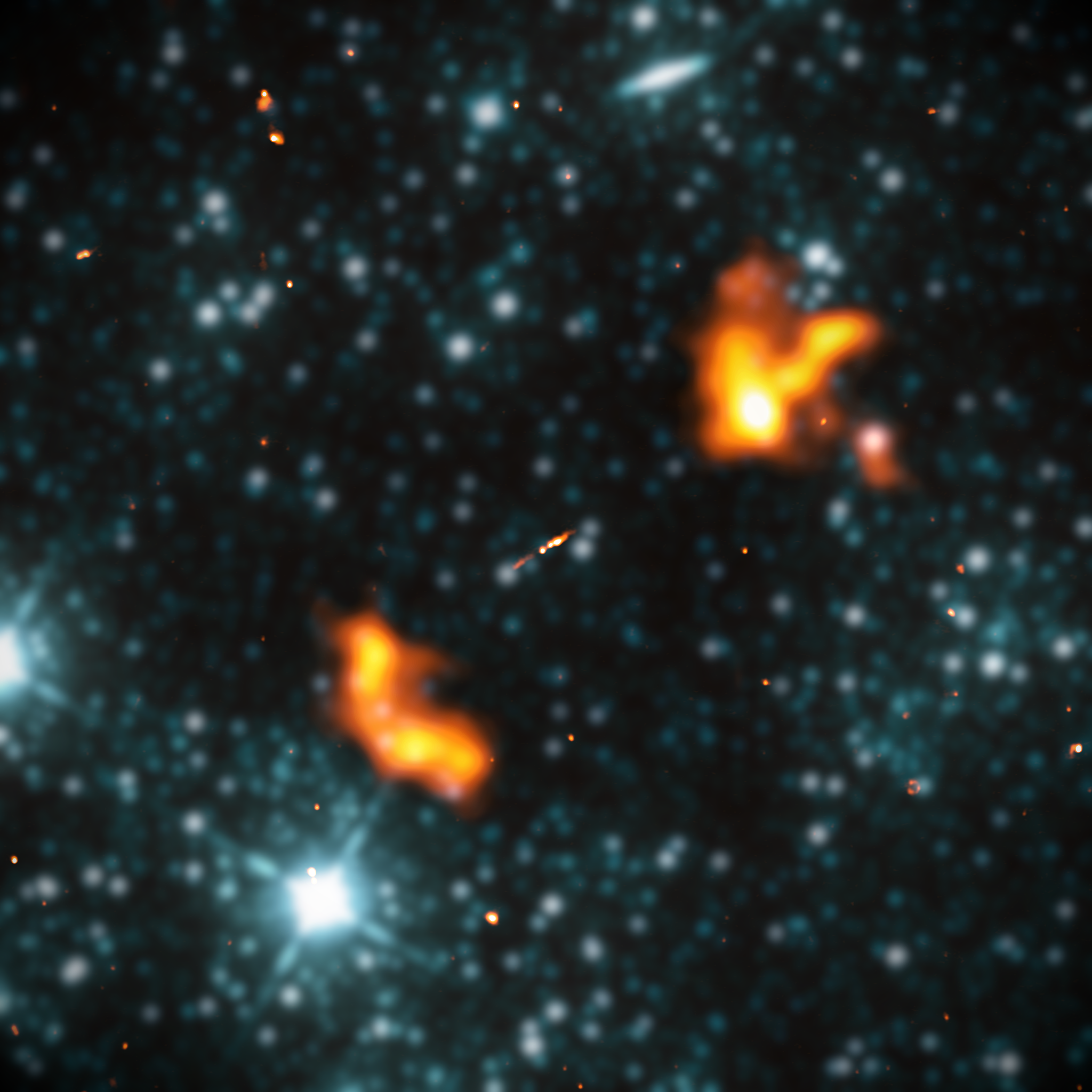
False-color image of one of the largest radio galaxies, Alcyoneus

This is a list of the largest radio galaxies currently discovered arranged by size. This list includes radio galaxies over 10 million light years across, equivalent to approximately 3 megaparsecs.

Radio galaxies with radio lobes (also known as radio emissions) that extend further than 2.3 million light years or 0.7 megaparsecs in length are classified as giant radio galaxies, also referred as GRGs. Giant radio galaxies that contain quasars in their galactic centers are commonly called giant radio quasars, also known as GRQs.

== Overview ==
A radio galaxy is a type of galaxy with vast areas of radio emissions stretching far beyond the apparent structure. The powerful radio lobes are generated by the jets from the active galactic nucleus. The very luminous galactic center known as the active galactic nucleus (AGN) is usually powered by a supermassive black hole.

== List ==
Below is the list of the largest radio galaxies known, with diameters of over 9.7 million light years or 3 megaparsecs. The radio lobes are usually measured using the total angular diameter and the distance of the host galaxy.

Radio galaxy name	Diameter of radio lobes in light-years	Diameter of radio lobes in megaparsecs	Notes
TXS 0033+252	26,042,000	7.985	Largest radio galaxy discovered so far.
Porphyrion	22,831,000	7	An article from 2025 suggests a diameter of 6.16 megaparsecs.
J0838+5327	21,461,000	6.58	
ILT J132739.02+350643.0	20,389,000	6.251	
J0103+2305	19,243,000	5.9	
J0947-1338	18,917,000	5.8	
ILT J092754.27+351037.1	18,880,000	5.789	
ILT J083456.98+541742.4	18,447,000	5.656	
J0901+4420	17,612,000	5.4	
J1108+2916	16,960,000	5.2	
SDSS J081956.41+323537.6	16,539,000	5.071	An article from 2025 suggests a diameter of 4.66 megaparsecs.
Alcyoneus	16,275,000	4.99	An article from 2025 suggests a diameter of 4.74 megaparsecs.
J2238+3305	16,014,000	4.91	
J1420-0545	15,871,000	4.866	An article from 2008 suggests a diameter of 4.69 megaparsecs.
SDSS J042220.84+151059.8	15,763,000	4.833	
J0843+0208	15,753,000	4.83	
ILT J141134.19+630011.6	15,691,000	4.811	
SDSS J142910.70+311245.0	15,669,000	4.804	
J0846+3747	15,656,000	4.8	
J1120+3118	15,362,000	4.71	
SDSS J131823.42+262622.8	15,075,000	4.622	An article from 2025 suggests a diameter of 4.37 megaparsecs.
J2035-6434	15,003,000	4.6	
3C 236	14,961,000	4.587	
J0157-6000	14,905,000	4.57	
SDSS J152634.77+262003.2	14,863,000	4.557	An article from 2025 suggests a diameter of 4.4 megaparsecs.
SDSS J121815.66+382407.5	14,644,000	4.49	An article from 2025 suggests a diameter of 4.8 megaparsecs.
J0000+1215	14,547,000	4.46	
J1052+5456C	14,514,000	4.45	
J1200+6523	14,481,000	4.44	
J0226+5927	14,318,000	4.39	
J1227+1437	14,286,000	4.38	
NVSS 2146+82	14,286,000	4.38	
J1450+6723	14,220,000	4.36	
J1006+3454	14,123,000	4.33	
QSO J0931+3204	14,106,000	4.325	An article from 2016 suggests a diameter of 4.447 megaparsecs.
J0156-0714	14,025,000	4.3	
SDSS J175735.88+405154.2	13,986,000	4.288	An article from 2025 suggests a diameter of 4.48 megaparsecs.
J1007+6847	13,927,000	4.27	
J0320-5330	13,764,000	4.22	
ILT J173106.33+292302.3	13,615,000	4.175	
SDSS J161622.52+111135.7	13,545,000	4.153	
J0228-0207	13,470,000	4.13	
J1841+4005	13,438,000	4.12	
J1303+5404	13,372,000	4.1	
ILT J163813.18+320505.8	13,356,000	4.095	
SDSS J154709.22+353846.1	13,291,000	4.075	
J1210+4808	13,275,000	4.07	
SDSS J013406.32+301537.2	13,255,000	4.064	An article from 2025 suggests a diameter of 3.1 megaparsecs.
ILT J112515.39+640028.5	13,108,000	4.019	
SDSS J082747.88+662813.6	13,105,000	4.018	An article from 2025 suggests a diameter of 3.74 megaparsecs.
J0422+1512	12,981,000	3.98	
J0839+0213	12,948,000	3.97	
J2321-1942	12,753,000	3.91	
J1050+5706	12,753,000	3.91	
SDSS J012440.54+194003.9	12,707,000	3.896	An article from 2025 suggests a diameter of 3.3 megaparsecs.
SDSS J155339.76+282813.1	12,639,000	3.875	
2MASX J18212693+2639350	12,586,000	3.859	An article from 2025 suggests a diameter of 3.7 megaparsecs.
SDSS J162656.58+543421.3	12,528,000	3.841	An article from 2024 suggests a diameter of 3.55 megaparsecs.
J1245+4604	12,524,000	3.84	
QSO J1410+2955	12,453,000	3.818	
J0153-2713	12,394,000	3.8	
J1118+6433	12,394,000	3.8	
J0352-2451	12,361,000	3.79	
AKSAP J0107-2347	12,361,000	3.79	An article from 2025 suggests a diameter of 3.68 megaparsecs.
SDSS J220605.67+275100.3	12,332,000	3.781	An article from 2025 suggests a diameter of 3.92 megaparsecs.
J1438+3355	12,329,000	3.78	An article from 2025 suggests a diameter of 3.6 megaparsecs.
SDSS J023544.96+310447.5	12,312,000	3.775	An article from 2025 suggests a diameter of 3.52 megaparsecs.
J1542+3736	12,296,000	3.77	
NVSS J090535+670408	12,290,000	3.768	
J1202+0211	12,263,000	3.76	
J1101-1151	12,263,000	3.76	
ILT J153532.25+435152.0	12,231,000	3.75	
J1320+6022	12,198,000	3.74	
J0509+0420	12,198,000	3.74	
J2145+819	12,195,000	3.739	
J1314+6937	12,133,000	3.72	
GRG J200843+004918	12,100,000	3.71	
J1637+3949	12,068,000	3.7	
J1558-2138	12,068,000	3.7	
ILT J082408.14+381850.9	12,066,000	3.699	
J1546+6838	12,003,000	3.68	
ILT J224103.12+273246.5	11,984,000	3.674	
J1637+3204	11,937,000	3.66	
J1113+2100	11,937,000	3.66	
SDSS J180117.72+510722.4	11,931,000	3.658	
J1637+1936	11,872,000	3.64	
ILT J134212.48+411138.0	11,867,000	3.638	
ILT J083017.89+595011.6	11,846,000	3.632	
SDSS J123900.69+360924.5	11,797,000	3.617	An article from 2025 suggests a diameter of 3.43 megaparsecs.
SDSS J102430.93+381842.8	11,797,000	3.617	An article from 2025 suggests a diameter of 3.37 megaparsecs.
J1547+5147	11,774,000	3.61	
ILT J092223.32+450004.7	11,763,000	3.606	
SDSS J172051.08+294256.8	11,624,000	3.564	
SDSS J090534.54+563052.0	11,592,000	3.554	An article from 2025 suggests a diameter of 3.05 megaparsecs.
SDSS J133105.80+293435.7	11,582,000	3.551	An article from 2025 suggests a diameter of 3.33 megaparsecs.
ILT J105716.30+535638.1	11,533,000	3.536	
SDSS J223649.76+251242.5	11,523,000	3.533	An article from 2025 suggests a diameter of 3.12 megaparsecs.
SDSS J230125.38+240148.2	11,504,000	3.527	An article from 2025 suggests a diameter of 3.09 megaparsecs.
J0156-6529	11,415,000	3.5	
J0905+5526	11,383,000	3.49	
J0047-6206	11,383,000	3.49	
AKSAP J0059-2352	11,383,000	3.49	An article from 2025 suggests a diameter of 3.44 megaparsecs.
SDSS J004848.01+021003.1	11,383,000	3.49	An article from 2025 suggests a diameter of 3.41 megaparsecs.
SDSS J220239.13+070656.7	11,360,000	3.483	
J1102+1345	11,350,000	3.48	An article from 2025 suggests a diameter of 3.07 mpc.
GRG J235531+025607	11,350,000	3.48	
SDSS J165113.78+320943.4	11,344,000	3.478	An article from 2025 suggests a diameter of 3.29 megaparsecs.
NVSS J064804+704939	11,318,000	3.47	
J1113-3801	11,318,000	3.47	
SDSS J004459.89+284748.5	11,298,000	3.464	An article from 2025 suggests a diameter of 3.3 megaparsecs.
J1605+4434	11,285,000	3.46	
J2223+1831	11,252,000	3.45	
J0648+7049	11,220,000	3.44	
GRG J123501.52+531755.09	11,220,000	3.44	
J0054-4952	11,155,000	3.42	
ILT J102928.87+390233.5	11,136,000	3.414	
J1049+1311	11,122,000	3.41	
J1423+3529	11,122,000	3.41	An article from 2025 suggests a diameter of 3.34 megaparsecs.
J0923+0742	11,089,000	3.4	
J1150+4618	11,057,000	3.39	
J0742-6407	11,057,000	3.39	
LEDA 2695924	11,053,000	3.389	
J2216-5737	10,991,000	3.37	
SDSSCGB 17961.2	10,969,000	3.363	
ILT J085551.47+541539.7	10,957,000	3.359	
J1036+3732	10,926,000	3.35	
SDSS J112912.14+273313.9	10,881,000	3.336	
SDSS J163659.07+541725.4	10,864,000	3.331	An article from 2025 suggests a diameter of 3.1 megaparsecs.
SDSS J092826.93+230448.0	10,855,000	3.328	An article from 2025 suggests a diameter of 3.62 megaparsecs.
J0044-3804	10,828,000	3.32	
J2347-6644	10,828,000	3.32	
J2108-3932	10,828,000	3.32	
SDSS J001152.65+310024.3	10,825,000	3.319	An article from 2025 suggests a diameter of 3.02 megaparsecs.
J1727+4615	10,796,000	3.31	
J0939+0540	10,796,000	3.31	
J1452-0230	10,763,000	3.3	
J2048-0520	10,763,000	3.3	
J0911+5440	10,763,000	3.3	
SDSS J125804.46+273046.0	10,740,000	3.293	
J1902-5605	10,731,000	3.29	
NVSS J121012+440331	10,704,000	3.282	
J0955-0744	10,698,000	3.28	
SDSS J084127.02+554627.1	10,691,000	3.278	An article from 2025 suggests a diameter of 3.1 megaparsecs.
SDSS J143011.92+410404.2	10,669,000	3.271	An article from 2025 suggests a diameter of 3.06 megaparsecs.
J0319-5340	10,665,000	3.27	
ILT J084606.48+611634.3	10,654,000	3.267	
J1452-2638	10,633,000	3.26	
J1006+4834	10,600,000	3.25	
J1213-1534	10,600,000	3.25	
J1234+5318	10,600,000	3.25	
SDSS J135119.31+340844.1	10,577,000	3.243	
SDSS J134436.33+291239.6	10,571,000	3.241	An article from 2025 suggests a diameter of 3.04 megaparsecs.
SDSS J112638.34+302541.9	10,551,000	3.235	An article from 2025 suggests a diameter of 3.1 megaparsecs.
SDSS J012342.20+293633.1	10,489,000	3.216	An article from 2025 suggests a diameter of 3.15 megaparsecs.
SDSS J223224.15+285753.3	10,486,000	3.215	An article from 2025 suggests a diameter of 3.14 megaparsecs.
ILT J143212.04+604558.8	10,476,000	3.212	
J0907+6706	10,470,000	3.21	
SDSS J103731.47+312948.9	10,460,000	3.207	An article from 2025 suggests a diameter of 3 megaparsecs.
SDSS J154742.69+384119.4	10,453,000	3.205	
SDSS J114333.93+425800.5	10,440,000	3.201	
SDSS J122329.86+313116.0	10,437,000	3.2	
J1411+6259	10,437,000	3.2	
J0105-0808	10,437,000	3.2	
J1220+3837	10,437,000	3.2	
J0153+5946	10,437,000	3.2	
J1008-2652	10,437,000	3.2	
J1400+3017	10,430,000	3.198	
ILT J073311.58+393815.5	10,403,000	3.19	
NVSS J140904+674748	10,355,000	3.175	
ILT J085412.34+601825.8	10,343,000	3.171	
J1104+6007C	10,339,000	3.17	
J0041+2912	10,339,000	3.17	
J0825+693	10,313,000	3.162	
J1305-3814	10,274,000	3.15	
J1311+4059	10,274,000	3.15	
SDSS J084354.54+494919.0	10,271,000	3.149	
J1343+3758	10,241,000	3.14	
J1650+3912	10,241,000	3.14	
J1616+4825	10,241,000	3.14	
SDSS J110420.29+600712.7	10,209,000	3.13	
J0101+5052	10,209,000	3.13	
J0740-6647	10,209,000	3.13	
SDSS J151731.75+320836.5	10,202,000	3.128	
SDSS J112823.80+095710.8	10,170,000	3.118	
SDSS J163820.93+441444.2	10,150,000	3.112	
J1812+6731	10,143,000	3.11	
ILT J105755.80+470446.4	10,113,000	3.101	
SDSS J115401.37+593454.2	10,111,000	3.1	
J0230-5230	10,111,000	3.1	
J1116-4234	10,111,000	3.1	
SDSS J020249.26+312959.1	10,104,000	3.098	
SDSS J141650.07+410150.4	10,085,000	3.092	An article from 2025 suggests a diameter of 3.05 megaparsecs.
SDSS J072238.85+424236.6	10,078,000	3.09	An article from 2025 suggests a diameter of 3.19 megaparsecs.
J1429+3230C	10,078,000	3.09	
FIRST J152157.7+572429	10,068,000	3.087	
SDSS J145004.45+571559.5	10,049,000	3.081	
J0039-1928	10,046,000	3.08	
J0019-0408	10,046,000	3.08	
SDSS J111709.38+673324.5	10,016,000	3.071	
ILT J134853.94+273705.5	9,995,000	3.065	
J2129-5340	9,980,000	3.06	
J0030-0312	9,980,000	3.06	
J1623-6919	9,980,000	3.06	
J1530+5243	9,980,000	3.06	
J0331-7713	9,980,000	3.06	
J0831+6711	9,915,000	3.04	
ILT J090337.96+344216.6	9,885,000	3.031	
SDSS J225412.25+254056.1	9,876,000	3.028	
SDSS J014009.73+224132.1	9,876,000	3.028	
ILT J152000.07+303127.2	9,873,000	3.027	
[DRB2020] 167	9,869,000	3.026	
J0006+2402	9,850,000	3.02	
J0648+3917	9,817,000	3.01	
J1229+5826	9,785,000	3	
J1301-0333	9,785,000	3	
J1511+4605	9,785,000	3	
NGC 6251	9,785,000	3	An article from 2020 suggests a diameter of 1.969 megaparsecs.

Listed below are superlative giant radio galaxies under 9.7 million light years or 3 megaparsecs in diameter.

Radio galaxy name	Size of radio lobes in light years	Size of radio lobes in megaparsecs	Notes
NGC 6185	8,297,000	2.544	Largest spiral-hosted radio galaxy.
Z 49-138	8,232,000	2.524	Largest lenticular-hosted radio galaxy.
DA 240	4,566,000	1.4	One of the first discovered giant radio galaxies.
ILT J141446.18+544658.8	4,312,000	1.322	Most massive giant radio galaxy, stellar mass is 1.2 trillion M_{☉}.
ILT J160819.77+601708.0	4,012,000	1.23	Least massive giant radio galaxy, stellar mass is 33,000 M_{☉}.
NGC 2300	3,496,000	1.072	Closest giant radio galaxy, redshift is z = 0.00635.
ILT J120019.48+361924.1	2,430,000	0.745	Most distant giant radio galaxy, redshift is z = 4.369

== See also ==
- Radio galaxy
- List of largest galaxies
- List of spiral DRAGNs
