= PKS 0634−20 =

Radio galaxy in the constellation of Canis Major

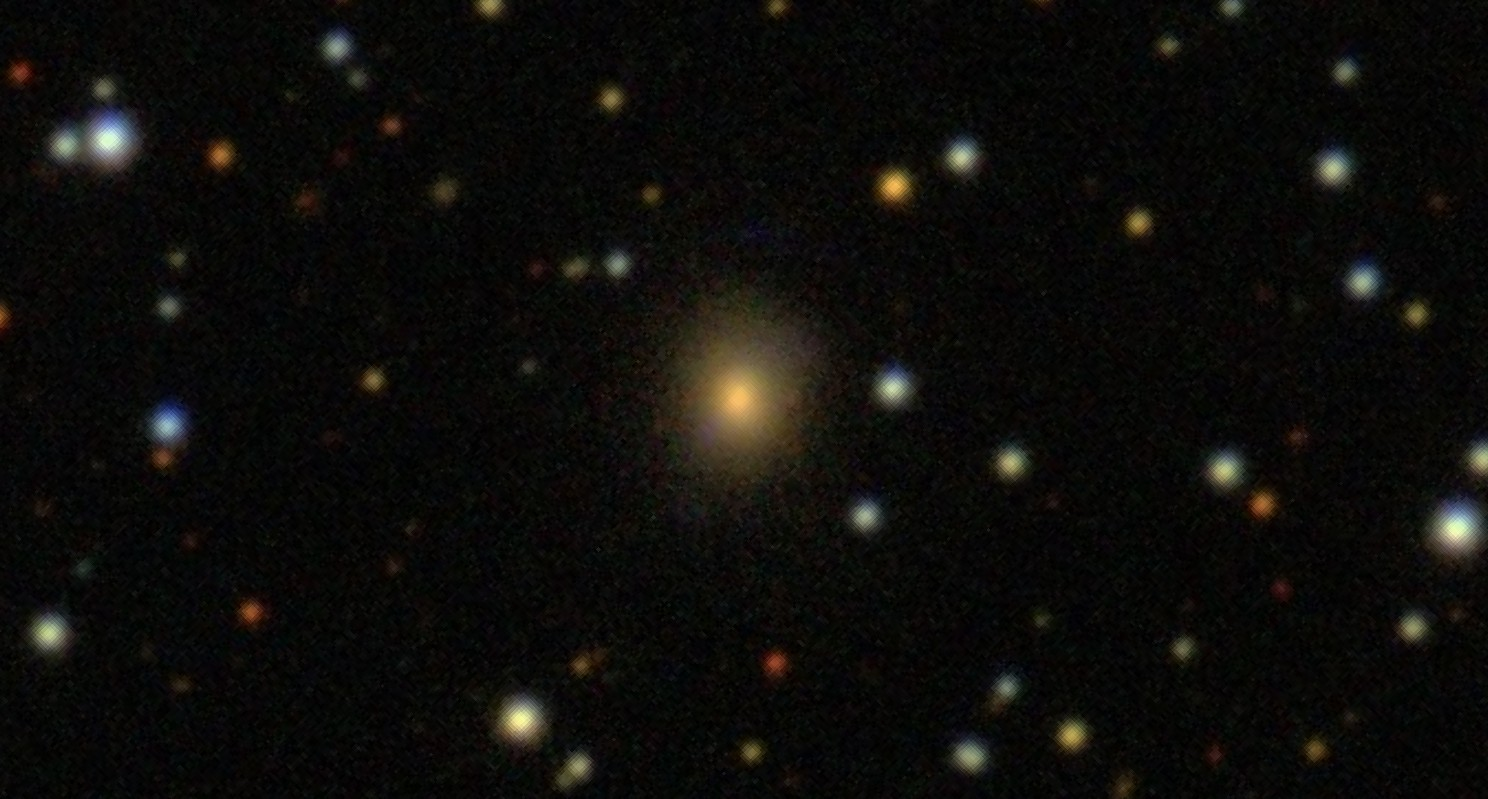
- The radio galaxy PKS 0634−20

Observation data (J2000 epoch)
- Constellation: Canis Major
- Right ascension: 06^{h} 36^{m} 32.25^{s}
- Declination: −20° 34′ 53.14″
- Redshift: 0.056456
- Heliocentric radial velocity: 16,925 km/s
- Distance: 753 Mly
- Apparent magnitude (V): 17.58
- Apparent magnitude (B): 18.27

Characteristics
- Type: E NLRG
- Size: ~184,400 ly (56.53 kpc) (estimated)

Other designations
- 2MASX J06363227−2034532, IRAS 06343−2032, 6dF J0636323−203453, PGC 19313, PKS B0634−205, PKS J0636−2036, Cul 0634−205, 0634−20

PKS 0634−20 is a powerful Fanaroff-Riley class Type II radio galaxy located in the constellation of Canis Major. It has a redshift of (z) 0.056 and was first discovered by astronomers who were conducting the Parkes catalogue survey at Parkes Observatory in 1964. This object is also classified as a Type 2 Seyfert galaxy.

== Description ==
PKS 0634−20 is classified as a giant radio galaxy with a complex radio structure. When imaged with a 21 centimeter radio map, the structure is best described as a double-triple made up of seven components with an unresolved southern bright component. Observations made by the Westerbork Synthesis Radio Telescope found the outer edges of two components have a separation gap of 14 arcseconds. In addition, the components are narrow and configured, similar to 3C 236.

Observations made with the Effelsberg 100-m Radio Telescope and Very Large Array, discovered there is a long radio emission bridge in PKS 0634−20. When imaged, the bridge is found extending to the outer collinear hotspots with its polarization degree varying from 8% to 30%. When travelling a far distance in terms of projection, there is a change in which the bridge becomes narrower and the polarization degree increases. Results also showed the hotspots located at north and south directions have polarization percentages of 5% and 20%. As mapping at 4".5 resolution also showed the same thing, this suggests either beam cancellation of the northern sub-parts of the hotspot or differential Faraday rotation. Imaging at high resolutions by the Australia Telescope Compact Array also showed the south hotspot has a significant sub-structure.

The host of PKS 0634−20 is a normal elliptical galaxy lying in the poor cluster environment. According to imaging by the Anglo-Australian Telescope, the appearance of the galaxy is described as peculiar with a sign of a filamentary structure showing an extension into a northwest quadrant. There is an emission line nebula extending by 20 kiloparsecs from its central nucleus with molecular gas estimated to be 3 × 10^{9} M_{☉}. As its mass is greater than the warm gas in the galaxy, this indicates the nebula is radiation-bound. The large quantity of gas is believed to be acquired from either a spiral or a gas-rich galaxy.

Strong doubly ionized oxygen narrow emission lines has been identified in the spectra of PKS 0634−20 with an extent of 70 kiloparsecs along its radio axis. Astronomers also suggested the galaxy might have a hidden quasar based on the discovery of a reddened source coinciding with its nucleus.
