= LEDA 896325 =

Giant spiral-hosted radio galaxy

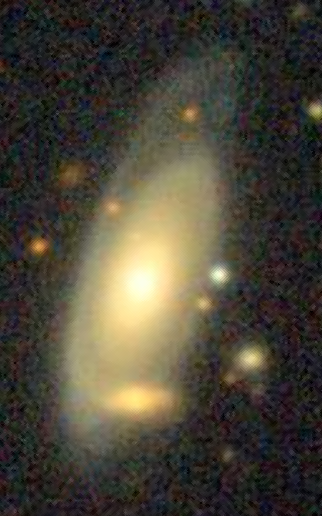
- DESI Legacy DR10 image of LEDA 896325

Observation data (J2000 epoch)
- Constellation: Virgo
- Right ascension: 13^{h} 50^{m} 36.14^{s}
- Declination: -16° 34' 49.51"
- Redshift: 0.097697
- Heliocentric radial velocity: 25142
- Distance: 1.423 bly (436.19 mpc)
- Apparent magnitude (B): 17.13

Characteristics
- Type: S
- Size: 308,600 ly (94,610 pc)

Other designations
- J1350-1634, NVSS J135036-163449, 2MASX J13503614-1634494

LEDA 896325 also known as J1350-1634, is a spiral galaxy, class I seyfert galaxy, and a BL Lac object located in the constellation of Virgo. The galaxy is approximately 1.42 billion light years (436 megaparsecs) away and has an apparent B magnitude of 17.13. It was discovered in 2003 by a HyperLEDA survey of 950,000 galaxies.

== Physical properties ==
LEDA 896325 is a very large spiral galaxy that is believed to be a field galaxy and is not associated with any known galaxy clusters. The galaxy is 309,000 light years (94,610 parsecs) across based on a distance of 1.42 billion light years away and an angular diameter of 44.3 arcsecs.

In the galactic center of LEDA 896325 is an active galactic nucleus (AGN), and it is also a quasar. In the active galactic nucleus it contains a central black hole with an estimated mass of 240 million M_{☉}, which ejects large amounts of gas forming its large radio emissions.

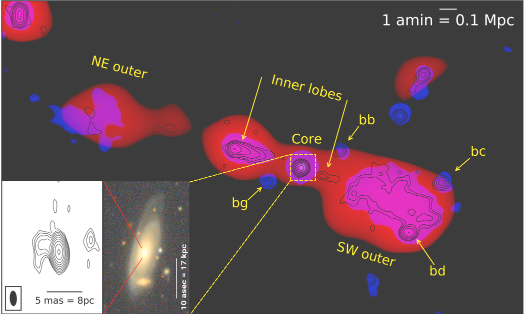
False-color image of the radio lobes of LEDA 896325

In 2025, it was discovered by RACS and GLEAM that LEDA 896325 was the host of ~2 megaparsec radio lobes. The radio lobes are considered as Fanaroff-Riley class II, they are edge-brightened and are far more luminous than their counterpart, it is also classified as a spiral DRAGN. It is also predicted to have episodic jet activity similar to J2345-0449. The exact dimensions of the radio lobes are 2.24 megaparsecs or roughly 7,310,000 light years across based on an angular diameter of 22 arcmin, making it the second largest spiral-hosted radio galaxy discovered only behind NGC 6185.

== See also ==
- NGC 6185, similar sized spiral radio galaxy.
- J2345-0449, another large spiral-hosted radio galaxy with episodic jet activity.
- List of spiral DRAGNs, includes LEDA 896325.
