= ESO 248-G10 =

Large spiral-hosted radio galaxy

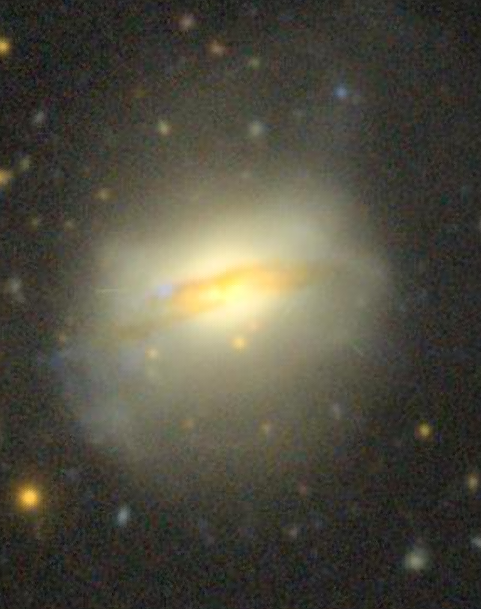
- DESI Legacy DR10 image of ESO 248-G10

Observation data (J2000 epoch)
- Constellation: Eridanus
- Right ascension: 03^{h} 20^{m} 57.56^{s}
- Declination: -45° 15' 10.53"
- Redshift: 0.0624
- Heliocentric radial velocity: 18124
- Distance: 893.4 mly (273.92 mpc)
- Group or cluster: Abell 3104
- Apparent magnitude (V): 15

Characteristics
- Type: Sc
- Mass: 200 billion M_{☉}
- Size: 368,700 ly (113,030 pc)

Other designations
- ESO 248-10, AM 0319-452, LEDA 12555, MRC B0319-454, MSH 03-4-03

ESO 248-G10 also known as MRC B0319-454, is a spiral galaxy, radio galaxy, and a Seyfert galaxy in the constellation of Eridanus. The galaxy is at redshift z = 0.0624 or approximately 893 million light years (274 megaparsecs) away and has a visual magnitude of 15. The galaxy is located in the galaxy cluster designated, Abell 3104. The galaxy was first mentioned in literature in 1960 in the second MSH catalog of radio sources.

== Physical properties ==
ESO 248-G10 is a large, massive spiral galaxy in a pair of gravitationally associated galaxies designated [T2015] nest 201388, consisting of this galaxy and 2MASX J03142173-4525128, which is a part of the larger Abell 3104 galaxy cluster. The galaxy is 369,000 light years (113,000 parsecs) across or roughly four times the size of the Milky Way calculated with an angular diameter of 85.11 arcsecs from ESO and a Virgo + GA + Shapley corrected redshift-based distance.

ESO 248-G10 is considered a class II Seyfert galaxy, which usually have very bright cores and narrower lines in their spectra, they also typically have broader absorption lines. The active galactic nucleus (also known as AGNs) has an estimated absolute magnitude of -25.9 corresponding to a luminosity of roughly 1.96 trillion L_{☉}, which is so luminous that it is suspected to be a quasar. The active galactic nucleus is powered by a supermassive black hole (commonly referred as SMBHs) with a predicted mass of 10^8.6, equivalent to 398.1 million M_{☉}.

ESO 248-G10 has a stellar mass of 2*10^11 equal to 200 billion M_{☉}, or about twice the mass of the Milky Way. The galaxy has a warped dust lane with large starburst bubbles of hot gas and plasma with an extent of 25,000 light years (8,100 parsecs) across, and have high rates of star formation.

In 1989, it was found that ESO 248-G10 was a giant radio galaxy with a projected size of 1.27 million parsecs, at the time of discovery it was the third largest radio galaxy. However, more recent studies from 2000 and 2009 suggests an extent of 2.51 million parsecs or 8.2 million light years across based on an angular diameter of 26 arcmin, and it is the second largest spiral-hosted radio galaxy discovered, only behind NGC 6185 in size. The radio lobes are class II Fanaroff-Riley morphology, which are edge-brightened and far more luminous than their counterpart.

== Supernova ==
One supernova has been observed in ESO 248-G10: SN 2026ahmy (Type Ia, mag. 19.51) was discovered by GOTO on 29 October 2026.

== See also ==
- NGC 6185, similar sized spiral-hosted radio galaxy.
- 3C 236, another giant radio galaxy found at around the same time.
