= 3C 326 =

Pair of galaxies located in the constellation Serpens

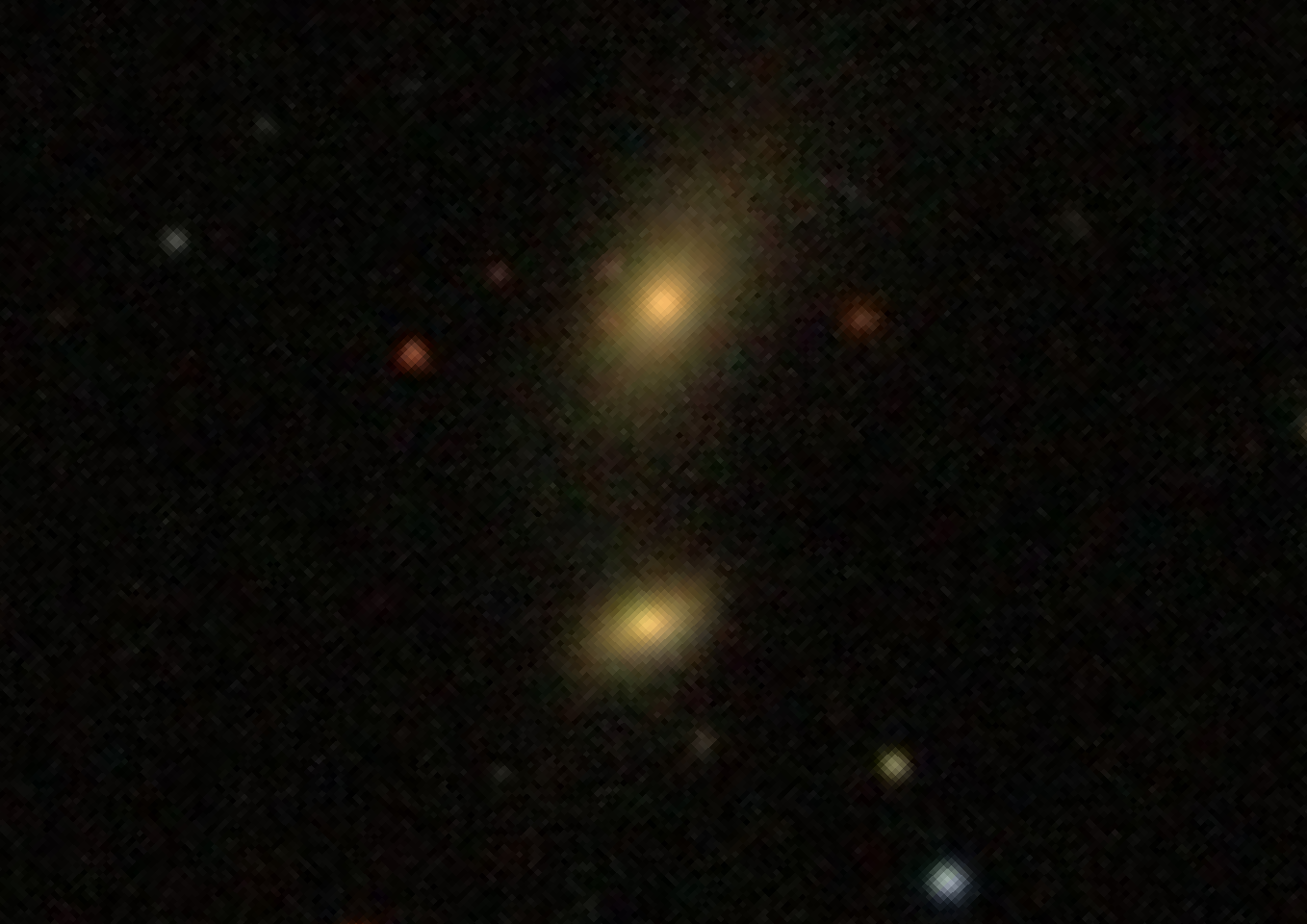
- SDSS image of 3C 326.

Observation data (J2000.0 epoch)
- Constellation: Serpens
- Right ascension: 15^{h} 52^{m} 09.00^{s}
- Declination: +20° 05′ 30.00″
- Redshift: 0.089000
- Heliocentric radial velocity: 26,682 km/s
- Distance: 1.213 Gly
- Apparent magnitude (V): 17.08

Characteristics
- Type: Gpair

Other designations
- 4C +20.37, PKS 1550+20, CoNFIG 233, 3C 326 ID, PGC 56261/LEDA 1615975, 3C 326N and 3C 326S

3C 326 is a pair of galaxies located in the constellation of Serpens. The tentative redshift of the system is (z) 0.089, meaning they are located 1.2 billion light-years from Earth. They were first discovered in the Third Cambridge Catalogue of Radio Sources in 1962 and are classified as radio galaxies.

== Description ==
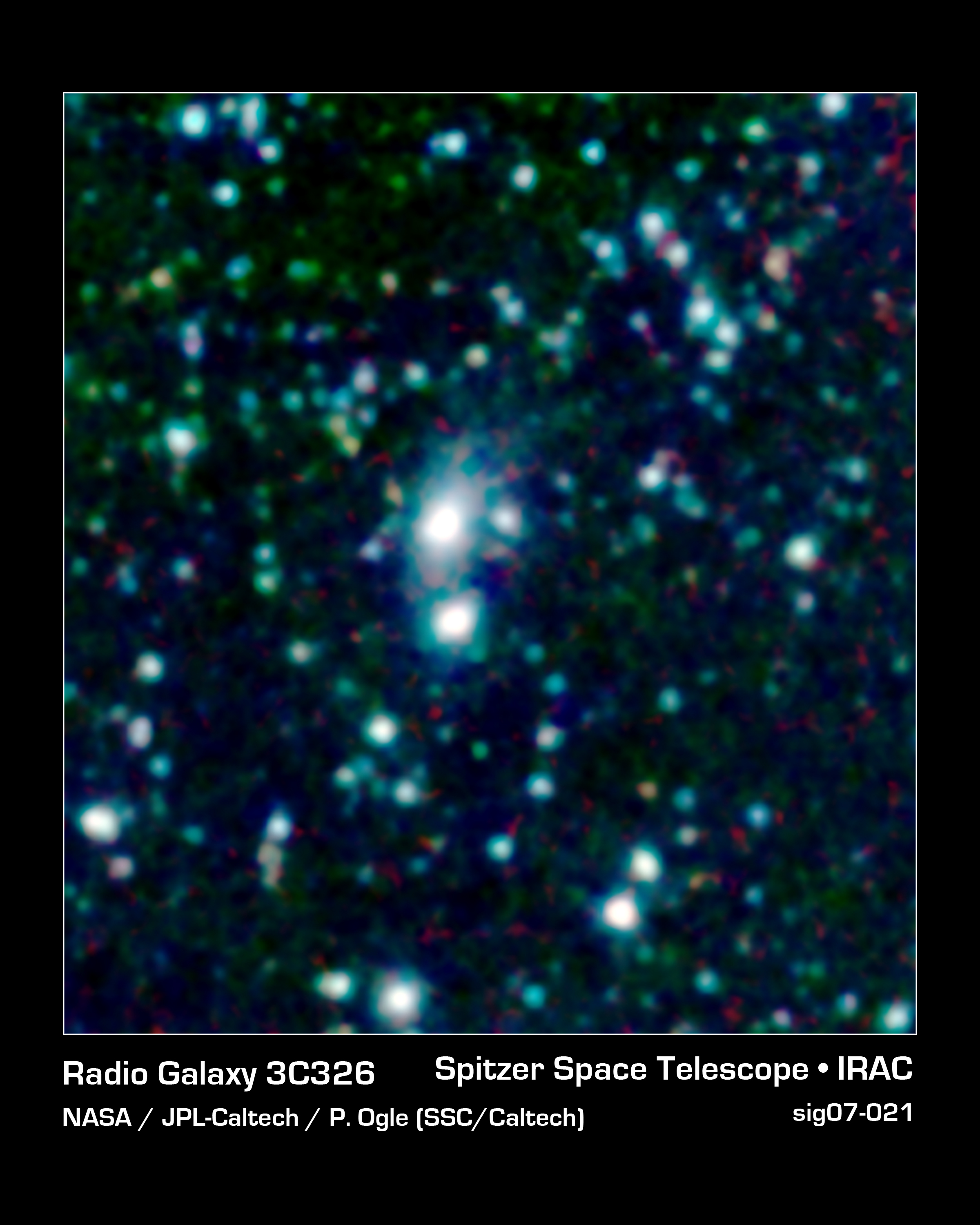
Spitzer Space Telescope image of 3C 326.

3C 326 is made up of two galaxies in the system. The first galaxy designated as 3C 326N or PGC 56261 in the northern direction, is classified as a large elliptical galaxy with a LINER nucleus, described as having a boxy appearance. Its total star formation rate is relatively low based on a Herschel Space Observatory dust photometry observation, and is estimated to be 0.087^{+0.106}_{−0.046} M_{☉} per year. The second galaxy designated as 3C 326S or LEDA 1615975 in the southern direction, is also an elliptical galaxy; however it is smaller than 3C 326N. When observed by the Hubble Space Telescope (HST) a narrow dust lane at the southern nucleus with a close orientation to its major axis at 105° is seen. The galaxies are gravitationally interacting, indicated by a tidal bridge and distortions. Their supermassive black hole masses are estimated as 5 × 10^{8} M_{☉} and 2 × 10^{8} M_{☉} respectively.

The central radio source of 3C 326 is debated to be located either inside 3C 326N or 3C 326S. It was thought to be located inside a giant galaxy initially observed by A.G. Willis in 1978, with an estimated linear extent of 1.7 megaparsecs, making this the second known largest radio galaxy in terms of size after 3C 236. However observations made in 1990 by S. Rawlings would identify the source to be located inside 3C 326N.

The radio core of 3C 326 when observed, is classified as compact but weak, being elongated east to west, with radio emission surrounding it. However it is unknown if the core is located either in 3C 326N or 3C 326S. The source has asymmetrical radio lobes, with the western lobe forming a linear structure that broadens towards the central component while the eastern lobe is short but also extending both east and south-east. The western lobe is heavily polarized by more than 60%. Non-thermal emission has also been detected from the western lobe as well with a flux density of 232.1 ± 2.4 at 8.51 GHz frequencies.

A study published in 2007 revealed detections of molecular hydrogen in 3C 326N. When observed, the hydrogen pure rotation lines are found to have an integrated luminosity of 8.0 × 10^{41} erg s^{−1} and a warm gas mass estimated at around 1.1 × 10^{9} M_{☉}. This might be caused through shock heating of the gas though tidal accretions caused by the interaction with 3C 326S. A gas disk was discovered in 3C 326N in 2011, with broad hydrogen rotational-vibrational lines across it at full width at half maximum speeds of 500 kilometers per seconds. Located at the end of the disk lies a cavity, which indicates a jet-inflated bubble found to be rapid expanding. The spectrum of 3C 326N is mainly dominated by a population of old stars aged greater than 10^{10} years and the total gas mass is 2 × 10^{9} M_{☉} based on its CO(1-0) line measurement.
