= List of spiral DRAGNs =

Spiral DRAGNs or Speca-like galaxies are a type of spiral galaxies which are also radio galaxies or which contain DRAGNs (Double Radio-source Associated with Galactic Nucleus).

Most DRAGNs are associated with elliptical galaxies, as are most double-lobed radio-galaxies. Spiral DRAGNs are inconsistent with currently known galaxy formation processes. As of 2023, there are nearly 36 spiral DRAGNs.

Lenticlular galaxies containing DRAGNs are as rare as spiral DRAGNs, with only 5 known examples as of 2020, including: Centaurus A, NGC 612 and NGC 1534. Nearby Seyfert galaxies containing small or galaxy-scale radio jets/lobes are not accepted as Specas or Spiral DRANGs.

The first spiral-host large radio galaxy, 0313-192, was discovered in 1998 by Michael J. Ledlow, Frazer N. Owen, and William C. Keel. After more than a decade the second case, Speca, was discovered by Ananda Hota and his collaborators in 2011. Since Speca was also episodic, two pairs of radio lobes on either sides of the host, it removed all doubts on possible background galaxy confusing as the host. Hereafter the search for Speca-like galaxy got intensified and by 2023 the total number of such galaxies has increased to three dozens, establishing itself as a new class of radio galaxies.

== List ==
Galaxy	Identified Date	Notes	References
ESO 0313-192	1998	First known spiral DRAGN, located in Abell 428. It is the first spiral DRAGN with VLBI detection.	
ESO 248-G10	2000	Second known spiral DRAGN, one of the largest with a scale of 2.51 megaparsecs.	
Speca	2011	First confirmed case due to its episodic radio jet nature. Hosted in a massive spiral and with giant Mpc-scale radio-lobes. It was the second galaxy shown to have three episodes of periodic activity, the first was an elliptical. (Note: SPECA = Spiral-host Episodic radio galaxy tracing Cluster Accretion)	
J2345-0449	2014	Third known spiral DRAGN with two episodic activities, observed at radio wavelengths and measuring about 1.6 megaparsecs in total size.	
SDSS J1649+2635	2014	Fourth known spiral DRAGN; first located in a grand design spiral galaxy. It was discovered by cross-matching spiral galaxies identified by galaxy zoo volunteers with the Unified Radio Catalog. It was the first systematic search for spiral DRAGNs.	
J0836+0532	2015	Two clear spiral arms	
J1159+5820	2012/2015	Candidate: Disturbed galaxy with signs of a merger.	
J1352+3126	2015	Candidate: Galaxy was well studied at the time of the discovery by Singh et al. The galaxy was classified as spiral or irregular galaxy.	
MCG+07-47-10	2016	radio source has a low luminosity	
NGC 6185	2022	The largest known spiral DRAGN, the scale of the radio lobes is 2.54 Mpc.	
J0354-1340	2022	spiral host that is a narrow-line Seyfert 1, size of the de-projected jets is 250 kpc	
J0209+0750	2022	loose spiral arms, has star-forming clumps	
J0806+0624	2022	several spiral arms and a luminous bar-like feature	
J1328+5710	2022	low-mass, low-redshift galaxy with many star-forming regions, at least two prominent arms and a strong bar. One of the few intermediate massive black holes (≤ 10^{5} M_{☉}) with a strong radio emission and the first with a double-lobed radio emission.	
J1656+6407	2022	extremely massive star-forming spiral galaxy	
J1128+2417	2022	star-forming clumps in the arms	
J1646+383	2022	dust-lane with peculiar arc-like shape	
J0326-0623	2023	two major spiral arms, scale of the radio lobes is 430 kpc	
J1110+0321	2023	scale of the radio lobes is 100 kpc	
J1134+3046	2023	scale of the radio lobes is 380 kpc	
NGC 5383	2023	Second spiral DRAGN found to be hosted by a grand design spiral galaxy, scale of the radio lobes is 70 kpc.	
LEDA 896325	2025	Similar to Speca and J2345-0449 this is episodic and giant (2Mpc)	
