= J2345−0449 =

Galaxy in the constellation of Aquarius

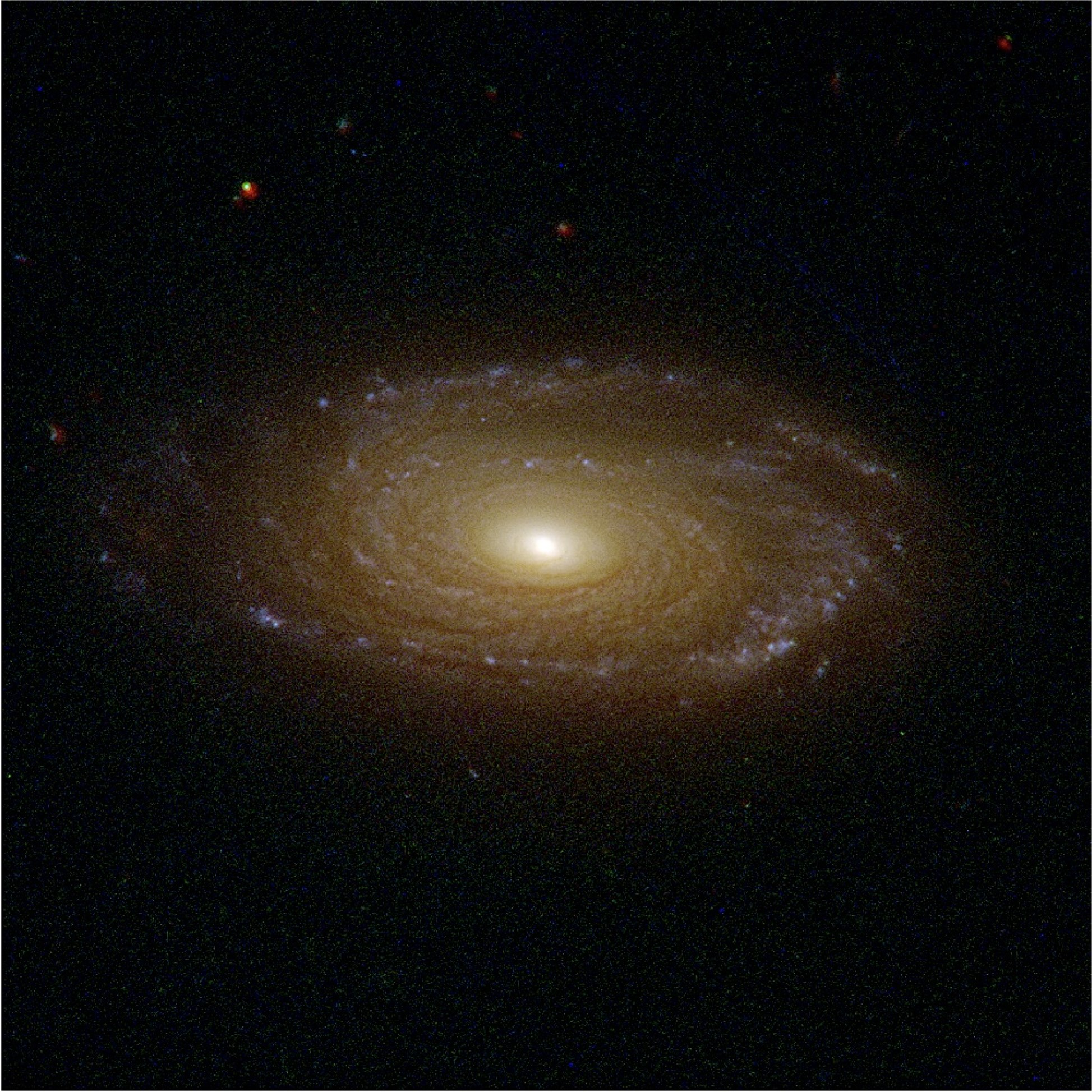
- J2345−0449 imaged by the Hubble Space Telescope

Observation data (J2000 epoch)
- Constellation: Aquarius
- Right ascension: 23^{h} 45^{m} 32.7347^{s}
- Declination: −04° 49′ 25.367″
- Redshift: 0.075566
- Heliocentric radial velocity: 22,654 km/s
- Distance: 947 Mly (290.3 Mpc)
- Apparent magnitude (V): 0.086
- Apparent magnitude (B): 0.113
- Surface brightness: 16.19

Characteristics
- Size: ~237,000 ly (72.67 kpc) (estimated)
- Apparent size (V): 0.62′ × 0.31′
- Notable features: One of the most massive spiral galaxies containing a radio jet

Other designations
- PGC 1052974, GRS J2345−0449, 2MASX J23453268−0449256, 6dF J2345327−044925

J2345−0449 or 2MASX J23453268−0449256, is a spiral galaxy located 947 million light-years away in the constellation of Aquarius. It contains an active galactic nucleus and is classified as a radio galaxy, containing relativistic jets that are projected out from its spiral host by ~1.6 Mpc, making these jets the largest and rarest known. It was discovered in 2014 by amateur astronomers, making it the third spiral DRAGN after ESO 0313-192 and Speca.

== Physical Properties ==
Mentioned as a megaparsec-scale object at redshift 0.0757, J2345−0449 is one of the largest and most massive spiral galaxies found in the local universe. It is also one of the largest radio sources discovered since the galaxy exhibits two sets of radio lobes found in near alignment and spanning a width of ~387.2 kpc (~452) and ~1.63 Mpc (~191). According to Very Large Array 6 cm imaging, the inner radio lobes are categorized either Fanaroff-Riley Class I or FR II morphology. A further study in 2025, showed these inner radio lobes extend right up to 387.2 kiloparsecs (Kpc).

J2345−0449 contains a fast rotation speed of V_{rot} = 371/sin (i) = 429 ± 30 km s^{−1} that is r ≥ 10 kpc away from its galactic center. It has a mass of M_{stellar} = 4 × 10^{11} M_{☉} and a surrounding ring of molecular gas measured 24 kpc wide in diameter. The galaxy has a star formation rate with a surface density measured to be Σ_{SFR} = 1.8 × 10^{−3} M_{☉} yr^{−1} kpc^{−2}. However it has a low factor between 30 and 70 as expected according to the Kennicutt-Schmidt law.

== Black hole mass ==
The black hole mass estimation is challenging since J2345−0449 has no classic bulge structure. According to Bagchi, the black hole has a mass of 2.5 ± 0.5 × 10^{8} M_{☉}. Further observations shows it has a mass of 1.4× 10^{9} M_{☉} when calculating the M_{BH}–σ relation proposed by Gültekin. However, according to researchers obtaining the M–σ relation from McConnell & Ma, the actual mass of J2345−0449 is 5 × 10^{9} M_{☉}.
