= Alcyoneus (galaxy) =

Large radio galaxy

SDSS J081421.68+522410.0
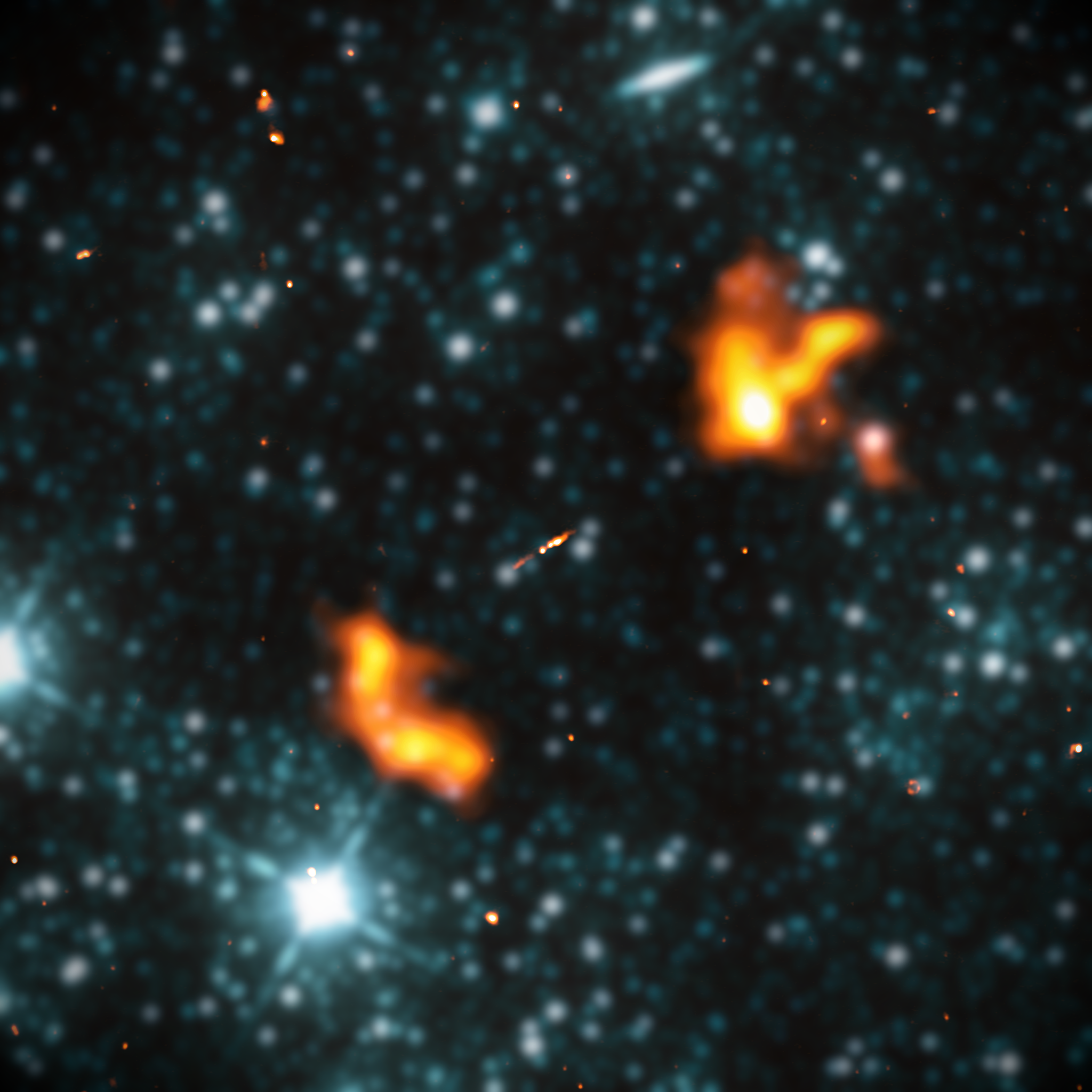
- Composite image of Alcyoneus in LOFAR radio data at 144 MHz (orange) and WISE infrared data at 3.4 micron (blue)

Observation data (J2000.0 epoch)
- Constellation: Lynx
- Right ascension: 08^{h} 14^{m} 21.68^{s}
- Declination: +52° 24′ 10.08″
- Redshift: 0.24674±0.00006
- Heliocentric radial velocity: 73,969.90±17.69 km/s
- Galactocentric velocity: 74,013±18 km/s
- Distance: 3.5 billion light-years (1.1 Gpc)
- Apparent magnitude (V): 17.16

Characteristics
- Type: E (purported with 89% chance)
- Mass: 2.4×10^{11} M_{☉}
- Size: 242,700 ly (74.40 kpc) (diameter; 25.0 r-mag/arcsec^{2})
- Notable features: Giant radio galaxy

Other designations
- Alcyoneus, 2MASS J08142169+5224103, WISEA J081421.70+522410.0

Alcyoneus is a low-excitation, Fanaroff–Riley class II radio galaxy located 3.5 billion light-years (1.1 gigaparsecs) from Earth, with host galaxy SDSS J081421.68+522410.0. It is located in the constellation Lynx and it was discovered in Low-Frequency Array (LOFAR) data by a team of astronomers led by Martijn Oei. As of 2024, it has the second-largest extent of radio structure of any radio galaxy identified, with lobed structures spanning 5 megaparsecs (16 million light-years) across, described by its discoverers at the time as the "largest known structure of galactic origin." (Note: Various media outlets at the time of Alcyoneus's announcement described it as "the largest galaxy known"; however, this is misleading. It has the largest radio ejecta of any radio galaxy, which are not often taken into consideration in determining galaxy sizes. For details about how physical diameters of galaxies are measured, see Galaxy#Physical diameters.) It has since been superseded by three other radio galaxies, SDSS J081956.41+323537.6, Porphyrion and TXS 0033+252, with lobed structures of 5.07 megaparsecs (17 million light-years), 7 megaparsecs (23 million light-years) and 8 megaparsecs (26 million light-years).

Aside from the size of its radio emissions, the central galaxy is otherwise of ordinary radio luminosity, stellar mass, and supermassive black hole mass. It is a standalone galaxy with an isophotal diameter at 25.0 r-mag/arcsec^{2} of about 242,700 light-years (74.40 kpc), with the nearest cluster located 11 million light-years away from it. The galaxy was named after the giant Alcyoneus from Greek mythology.

== Discovery ==
Alcyoneus was first reported in a paper published in February 2022 by Martijn Oei and colleagues after obtaining results from the Low-Frequency Array (LOFAR) Two-metre Sky Survey (LoTSS), an interferometric radio survey of the Northern Sky, as part of a search that resulted in the discovery of over 8,000 new giant radio galaxies. The object was first observed as a bright, three-component radio structure visible on at least four spatial resolutions of the LoTSS (6-, 20-, 60- and 90-arcsecond resolutions). The two outer components of the radio structure are separated by a similar distance to the smaller, elongated radio structure, signifying their nature as possible radio lobes. Further confirmations using radio-optical overlays dismiss the possibility of the two being separate radio lobes from different galaxies, and confirm that they have been produced by the same source.

== Characteristics ==
Alcyoneus has been described as a giant radio galaxy, a special class of objects characterized by the presence of radio lobes generated by relativistic jets powered by the central galaxy's supermassive black hole. Giant radio galaxies are different from ordinary radio galaxies in that they can extend to much larger scales, reaching upwards to several megaparsecs across, far larger than the diameters of their host galaxies. In the case of Alcyoneus, the host galaxy does not host a quasar and is relatively quiescent, with spectral imaging from the Sloan Digital Sky Survey's 12th data release (SDSS DR12) suggesting a star formation rate of only 0.016 solar masses per year (1.6×10^{−2} M_{☉}/a). This classifies it as a low excitation radio source, with Alcyoneus obtaining most of its energy due to the relativistic process of the central galaxy's jet rather than radiation from its active galactic nucleus.

The central host galaxy of Alcyoneus has a stellar mass of 240 billion solar masses (2.4×10^{11} M_{☉}), with its central supermassive black hole estimated to have a mass of 390±170 million solar masses ((3.9±1.7)×10^{8} M_{☉}); both typical for elliptical galaxies, but substantially lower than for similar galaxies generating giant radio sources.

It is currently unknown how Alcyoneus's radio emissions grew so large. One explanation proposes that the radio galaxy's cosmic web environment might be less dense than that of other giant radio galaxies, leading to a lower resistance to growth. In comparison to other known giant radio galaxies, Alcyoneus does not appear to have a particularly massive stellar population or central black hole, or particularly powerful jet streams.

== See also ==
- List of largest galaxies
- Hercules A
- Cygnus A
- List of galaxies with notable features
