= NVSS =

NVSS may refer to:

- National Vital Statistics System, a U.S. government vital statistics system
- NRAO VLA Sky Survey, an astronomical survey of the northern hemisphere
  - NVSS designation, names like NVSS 2146+82 for objects catalogued by the survey
- North View Secondary School, a former school in Yishun, Singapore
- North Vista Secondary School, a school in Sengkang, Singapore
- N. V. S. S. Prabhakar, a politician from Telangana, India
- Santo-Pekoa International Airport, ICAO code NVSS
- Nechako Valley Secondary School, in School District 91 Nechako Lakes in Canada
