= NGC 5383 =

Grand-design spiral galaxy

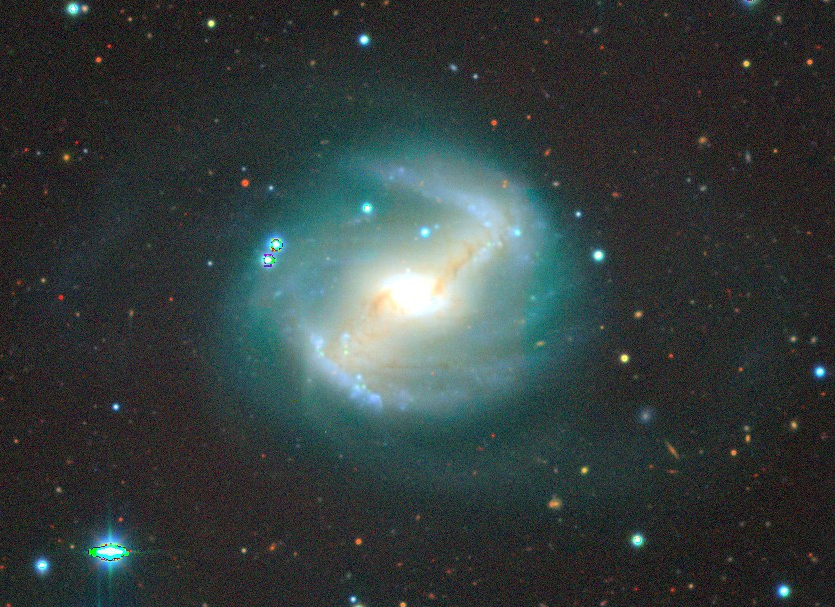
- DESI Legacy DR10 image of NGC 5383

Observation data (J2000 epoch)
- Constellation: Canes Venatici
- Right ascension: 13^{h} 57^{m} 04.97^{s}
- Declination: +41° 50' 46.42"
- Redshift: 0.007572
- Heliocentric radial velocity: 2431
- Distance: 110.71 Mly (33.94 Mpc)
- Group or cluster: LGG 363
- Apparent magnitude (V): 11.4

Characteristics
- Type: SB(rs)b pec
- Mass: 311.87 billion (halo and stellar mass) M_{☉}
- Size: 151,800 ly (46,540 pc)

Other designations
- UGC 8875, Markarian 281, LEDA 49618, Z 219-33, MaNGA 1-575771, KUG 1355+420

NGC 5383 also known as Markarian 281, is a grand design spiral galaxy, barred spiral galaxy, starburst galaxy, and radio galaxy in the constellation of Canes Venatici. The galaxy has a visual magnitude of 11.4, which is visible with a small telescope. The galaxy is considered a prototype barred spiral galaxy along with NGC 1300. The galaxy is very near, at redshift z = 0.007572, equivalent to a distance of roughly 111 million light years (34 megaparsecs). The galaxy is located in the galaxy cluster designated LGG 363, which includes this galaxy, NGC 5362, NGC 5353, and NGC 5337. NGC 5383 was discovered on April 9, 1787 by William Herschel, and was described as "considerably bright, considerably large, round, and a gradually brighter middle".

== Characteristics ==
NGC 5383 is a typical sized spiral galaxy in the galaxy cluster, LGG 363. The galaxy has a physical diameter of 152,000 light years (46,540 parsecs), or about one and half times the size of the Milky Way. This diameter is based on an angular diameter of 4.71 arcmin (282 arcsecs) from the 2MASS K-band total mag and a mean redshift-independent distance of ~111 million light years (~34 megaparsecs) away.

NGC 5383 has a large, massive, diffuse halo composed of neutral atomic hydrogen. The halo of NGC 5383 has a size of 1.63 million light years (500,000 parsecs), and the halo has a stellar population of mainly metal-poor white dwarfs. The large halo of NGC 5383 has an estimated mass of 263 billion M_{☉}, or roughly four or five times less massive than the halo of the Milky Way.

NGC 5383 has a predicted stellar mass of 48.6 billion M_{☉}, or approximately 4 times less massive than the stellar mass of the Milky Way. The galaxy has a young stellar population of O-type stars and B-type stars in the galactic bulge of NGC 5383. The galaxy is also considered as a mild starburst galaxy with a star-formation rate of 0.126 M_{☉}, similar to the star-formation rate of IC 10.

NGC 5383 has a corrected absolute B magnitude of -21.3 based on an apparent B magnitude of 12.5, which is equal to a total galactic luminosity of 48 billion L_{☉}.

NGC 5383 has ten to twenty bright H II regions, similar to the giant H II regions in the Pinwheel Galaxy (Messier 101). Five of these H II regions near the galactic center of NGC 5383 have been classified as emission nebulae. The largest of the H II regions are up to 13,000 light years (4,000 parsecs) across, and the total mass of the H II regions is 2 billion M_{☉}.

NGC 5383 is interacting with three known galaxies, UGC 8877, LAMOST J135707.72+415027.2, and LAMOST J135700.66+415114.9. One of these galaxies, UGC 8877 is warping the dust lane of NGC 5383, causing these two galaxies to be connected by a gas flow extending 147,000 light years (45,000 parsecs) across.

The galactic center of NGC 5383 contains a active galactic nucleus (also known as an AGN) The active galactic nucleus is powered by a 63.1 million M_{☉} central supermassive black hole (also referred as an SMBH), which accretes matter and ejects it forming the galaxy's radio lobes.

It was first found in 1978 that NGC 5383 was a radio galaxy, and hosted galaxy-scale relativistic jets that are 46,000 light years (14,000 parsecs) across. In 2023, it was discovered in the second data-release of the LOFAR Two-Metre Sky Survey (LoTSS) that NGC 5383 generated radio lobes with an extent of 214,000 light years (65,550 parsecs) across. The double radio lobed structure of NGC 5383 have a class II Fanaroff-Riley morphology, which are edge-brightened and far more luminous than their counterpart. NGC 5383 is the second spiral DRAGN discovered that it is hosted by a grand-design spiral galaxy.

== Supernova ==
One supernova has been identified in NGC 5383: SN 2005cc, which had a peak magnitude of 17.7 and it was classified a peculiar Type Ia supernova (SNIa pec). SN 2005cc was discovered in May 2005 by Tim Puckett and Alex Langoussis. Type Ia supernovae happen when two stars merge together, with one of the stars being a white dwarf.

== See also ==
- NGC 1300, another barred spiral galaxy
- Pinwheel Galaxy, similar grand-design spiral galaxy.
