= NGC 612 =

Galaxy in the constellation Sculptor

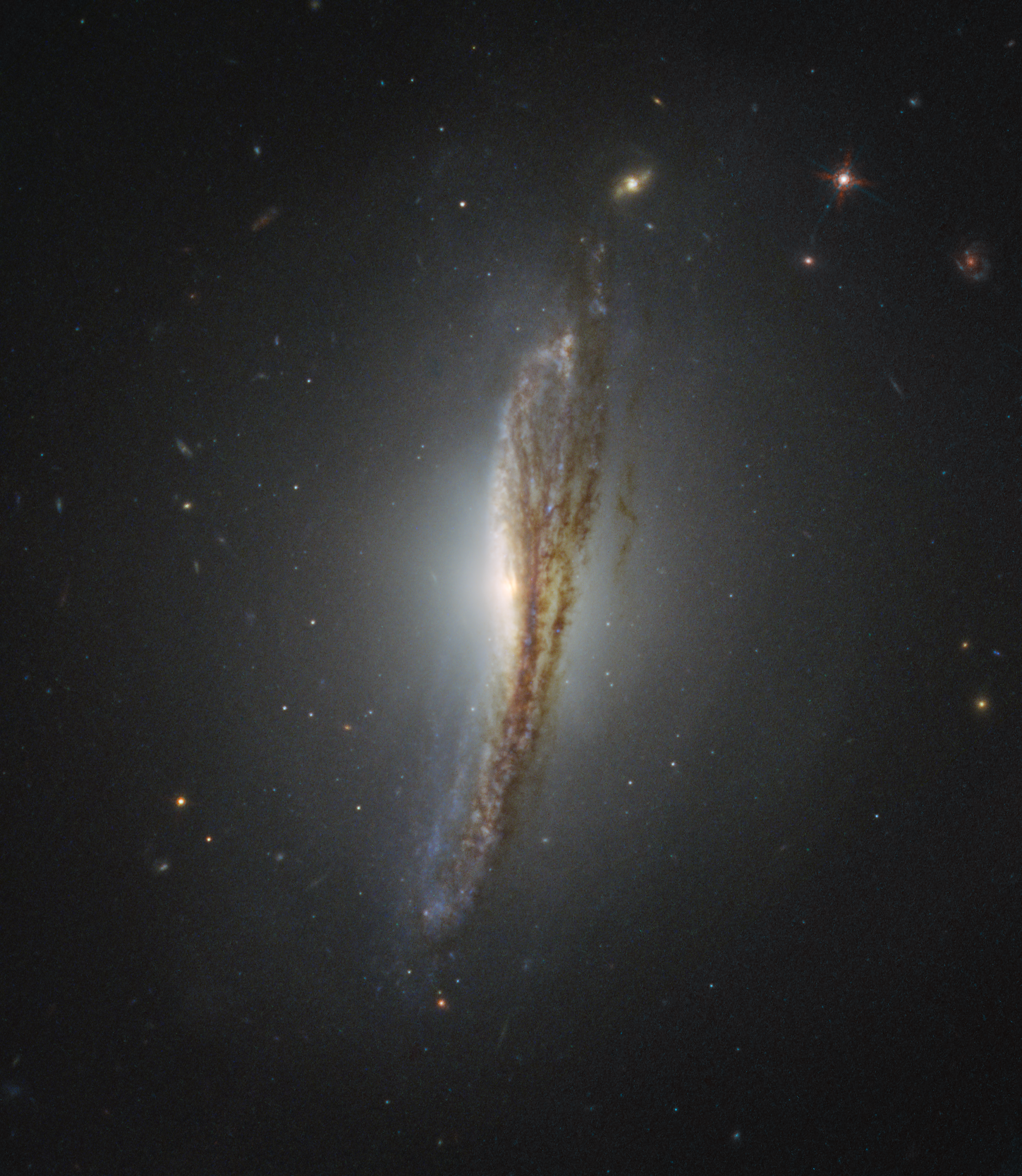
- Hubble Space Telescope image of NGC 612

Observation data (J2000 epoch)
- Constellation: Sculptor
- Right ascension: 01^{h} 33^{m} 57.74^{s}
- Declination: −36° 29′ 35.7″
- Redshift: 0.02977 ± 0.00010
- Heliocentric radial velocity: 8925 ± 29 km/s
- Distance: 388×10^{6} ly (119.33 ± 8.36 Mpc)
- Apparent magnitude (V): 13

Characteristics
- Type: S0a
- Size: ~440,000 ly (135 kpc) (estimated)
- Apparent size (V): 1.5 × 0.9 arcmin
- Notable features: Rare example of a non-elliptical radio galaxy

Other designations
- MCG -06-04-046, PGC 5827

NGC 612 is a large lenticular galaxy in the constellation of Sculptor located approximately 388 million light-years from Earth. It is a type II Seyfert galaxy with a diameter of 440,000 light-years across and thus has an active galactic nucleus. NGC 612 has been identified as an extremely rare example of a non-elliptical radio galaxy, hosting one of the nearest powerful FR-II radio sources.

== Observation history ==
The object was discovered by British astronomer John Herschel on 29 November 1837. John Louis Emil Dreyer, compiler of the first New General Catalogue of Nebulae and Clusters of Stars, described NGC 612 as "faint, very small, round, 12th magnitude star to the west."

== Physical characteristics ==
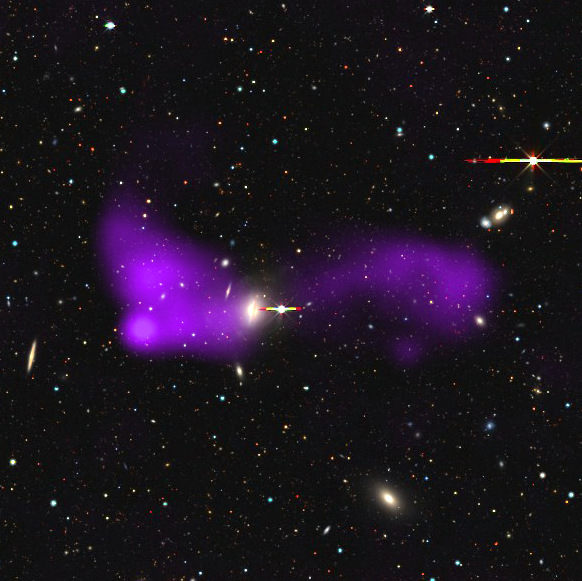
Radio emission around NGC 612

NGC 612 has a fairly well-developed luminous disc seen almost edge-on and features a strong dust ring. The disk features an unusually young star population with ages in the range ~0.04–0.1 Gyr. The galaxy is surrounded by an enormous disc of cool neutral hydrogen gas with a mass of 2.0×10^{10} M_{☉} distributed in a 140 kpc wide structure along the galactic disc and dust lane of NGC 612. The majority of the gas is relatively settled in regular rotation with a velocity of 850 km/s.

NGC 612 is one of 5 (as of 2020) known lenticular galaxies that show large-scale radio emissions. Both spiral galaxies and lenticular galaxies rarely host large scale radio emissions. It is not understood why these types of galaxies are so rare. The supermassive black hole (SMBH) at the center of NGC 612, which powers the radio emission, has a mass with a lower limit of 3.2×10^{9} M_{☉}.

A faint bridge, spanning 400 kpc, exists between NGC 612 and the gas-rich barred spiral galaxy NGC 619, indicating that an interaction between both galaxies occurred at some point. Current or past interaction, such as a merger event, is currently the most likely trigger of NGC 612's radio source.

== See also ==
- NGC 4151 – another example of a non-elliptical radio galaxy
- List of galaxies
