= Porphyrion (disambiguation) =

Porphyrion is a Giant, and an opponent of Heracles in Greek mythology.

Porphyrion may also refer to:

- Porphyrion (radio galaxy), a giant radio galaxy
- Pomponius Porphyrion, a Latin grammarian and commentator on Horace
- Saxifraga sect. Porphyrion, a section of the genus Saxifraga
- Porphyrion (mythology), other figures in Greek mythology
