= Speca =

Galaxy in the constellation Virgo

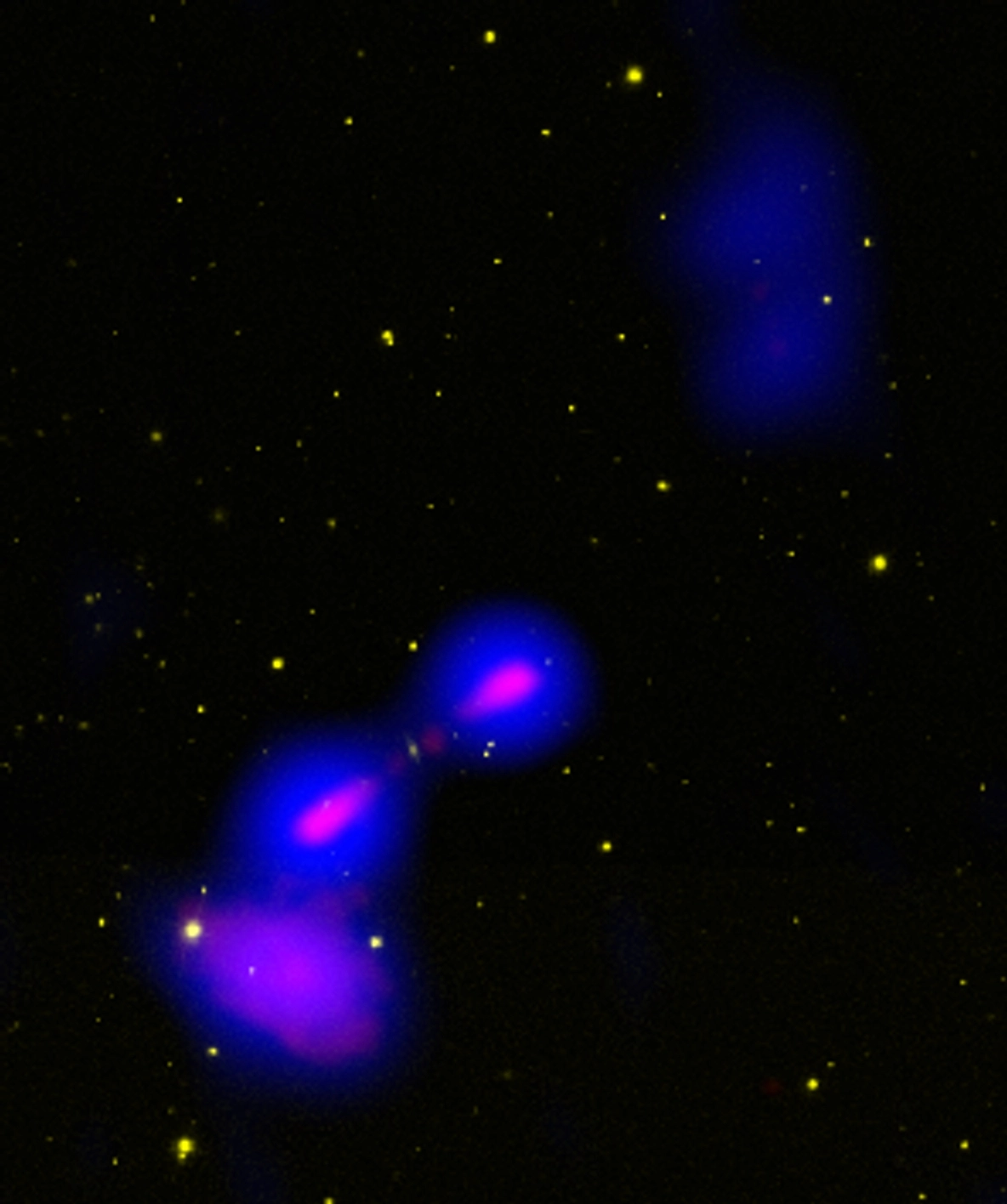
- A radio composite image of Speca

Observation data (J2000 epoch)
- Constellation: Virgo
- Right ascension: 14^{h} 09^{m} 48.80^{s}
- Declination: −03° 02′ 33.0″
- Redshift: 0.137639 ± 2.94e-5
- Distance: 1.9 Bly (612.51 Mpc)

Characteristics
- Type: BrClG
- Size: 396,000 ly
- Apparent size (V): ?
- Notable features: N/A

Other designations
- LCRS B140713.3-024824, LCLG -03 221.01, 2MASX J14094882-0302330, 2MASS J14094886-0302325, PGC 119230

Speca, discovered in 2011, is an exotic radio galaxy or a rare spiral/disk galaxy where the central supermassive black hole is actively accreting matter surrounding itself and ejects two giant, million light year long, plasma lobes in opposite directions.Speca is located around 1.9 billion light-years away in the constellation Virgo.

== Discovery and significance ==
Speca was discovered by an international team of astronomers led by Dr Ananda Hota, using archival data from Sloan Digital Sky Survey (SDSS), Very Large Array and observations from the Giant Meterwave Radio Telescope. Where almost all radio galaxies are hosted by massive, featureless, elliptical galaxies, Speca is the first confirmed exception that such giant plasma lobes can also be hosted by spiral galaxies. This confirmation came after 12 long years of the first suspected case ESO 0313-192. Speca was a convincing case because it has two, and possibly three, episodes of such plasma lobe emission and rotation of the spiral galaxy, fast and flat, is clearly observed.

Soon after this, search for Speca-like exotic objects were intensified, and in the next 12 years the total number increased to close to three dozen. Due to its exotic nature, some have started calling it Spiral DRAGNs, despite the word DRAGNs not used commonly for radio galaxies. The growing list can be found here List of Spiral DRAGNs. Since such galaxies are rarely seen in nearby Universe and elliptical galaxies were yet to form in the formative era of our Universe, it has been speculated that, Speca-like radio galaxies hosted in giant spirals may be more common in the young Universe. Future observations with giant optical telescopes (e.g. Thirty Metre telescope, Extremely Large Telescope ) combined with sensitive observations with low frequency radio telescopes ( e.g. LOFAR, Giant Meterwave Radio Telescope and Square Kilometre Array Observatory ) may find many of them to understand galaxy evolution better.
