= NVSS 2146+82 =

Giant radio galaxy

Observation data (J2000.0 epoch)
- Constellation: Cepheus
- Right ascension: 21^{h} 45^{m} 30^{s}
- Declination: +81° 54′ 55″
- Redshift: 0.145

Characteristics
- Type: GRG; gE(pec);
- Apparent size (V): 4h_{50}^{−1} Mpc

Other designations
- NVSS 2146+82, WN B2147+81, WN B2147+8141, PGC 2785926

NVSS 2146+82 (WN B2147+81) is a giant radio galaxy, one of the largest known. At the time of its discovery in 2000, it was the second largest, second only to 3C236. The optical counterpart to the radio object is a peculiar giant elliptical galaxy. The radio galaxy is 4.380 Mpc (14.29 Mly) across.

The galaxy cluster in which this galaxy is situated has an Abell richness class of 0 or 1. The cluster members were misidentified when originally surveyed, as part of Zw Cl 2147.0+8155, a background rich cluster.

== See also ==
- Active galactic nucleus
