= TXS 0033+252 =

Largest radio galaxy discovered

- DESI Legacy DR9 image of TXS 0033+252

Observation data (J2000 epoch)
- Constellation: Andromeda
- Right ascension: 00^{h} 36^{m} 15.692^{s}
- Declination: +25° 33' 29.99"
- Redshift: 0.62542
- Distance: 5.936 bly (1,820 mpc)

Characteristics
- Mass: 195.21 billion M_{☉}
- Size: 48,700 ly (14,940 pc)

Other designations
- TXS 0033+252, NVSS J003616+253332, ILT J003621.03+253500.9

TXS 0033+252 also known as NVSS J003616+253332, is a radio galaxy located in the constellation of Andromeda. The galaxy is approximately 5.94 billion light years (1,820 megaparsecs) away and has an apparent Z magnitude of 19.4. It was discovered in 1987 by the Green Bank Telescope in the 87GB survey of radio sources. As of 2024, TXS 0033+252 is the largest known radio galaxy with an extent of 8 megaparsecs.

== Physical properties ==
The galaxy is a small, medium-mass galaxy that is not associated with any galaxy clusters, classifying it as a field galaxy. It has a diameter of 48,700 light years (14.94 kiloparsecs) based on a distance of 5.94 billion light years (1,820 megaparsecs) and an angular diameter of 1.693 arcsecs. It also has an estimated stellar mass of 195 billion M_{☉}.

In 2024, it was discovered from the LOFAR Two-Metre Sky Survey (LoTSS) that TXS 0033+252 hosted a radio structure with an extent of 7.985 megaparsecs across or 26.04 million light years based on an angular diameter of 19 arcmin. As of 2025, this is believed to be the largest radio structure of any radio galaxy, succeeding Porphyrion in size which is 7 megaparsecs across.

== See also ==
- List of largest radio galaxies, includes TXS 0033+252.
- Porphyrion, previous largest radio galaxy.
