= Sky-Map.org =

Wiki and interactive sky map of celestial objects

- Website type: Web mapping
- Available in: Multilingual
- Website: sky-map.org
- Commercial: No
- Registration: Yes
- Current status: Active

Sky-Map.org (or WikiSky.org) is a wiki and interactive sky map that covers over half a billion known celestial bodies. WikiSky is designed, in part, as a wiki. Users can edit information about different stars by writing articles, adding Internet links, uploading images, or creating a special interest group for a specific task.

The website, although still available for users to visit, has shown little activity since 2010. A significant amount of vandalism, in the form of adding unrecognized proper names to stars, exists and is still occurring as of now.

== Software ==
WikiSky can represent the sky using data from several surveys, including GALEX, DSS, and SDSS. In each mode, the user can access the name and a brief description of visible space objects. This can be used to access more detailed information, including articles and different photo images. It also has its own API so that code can be written to access maps, objects’ information and SDSS data.

== Image copyright status ==
Some images used in WikiSky, such as the ones from Digitized Sky Survey (DSS2), are available for non-commercial use. The DSS data rights are held by multiple institutions. Sloan Digital Sky Survey (SDSS) images are now in the public domain, although earlier data releases were for non-commercial use only. Images from the Hubble Space Telescope (HST), Spitzer Space Telescope (infrared), and GALEX (ultraviolet) are in the public domain as works by the US government.

== See also ==
- WorldWide Telescope
- Stellarium (software)
- Google Sky
- Sloan Digital Sky Survey
