= Porphyrion (radio galaxy) =

Radio galaxy located in the constellation of Draco, 8 billion light years away

J152932.16+601534.4
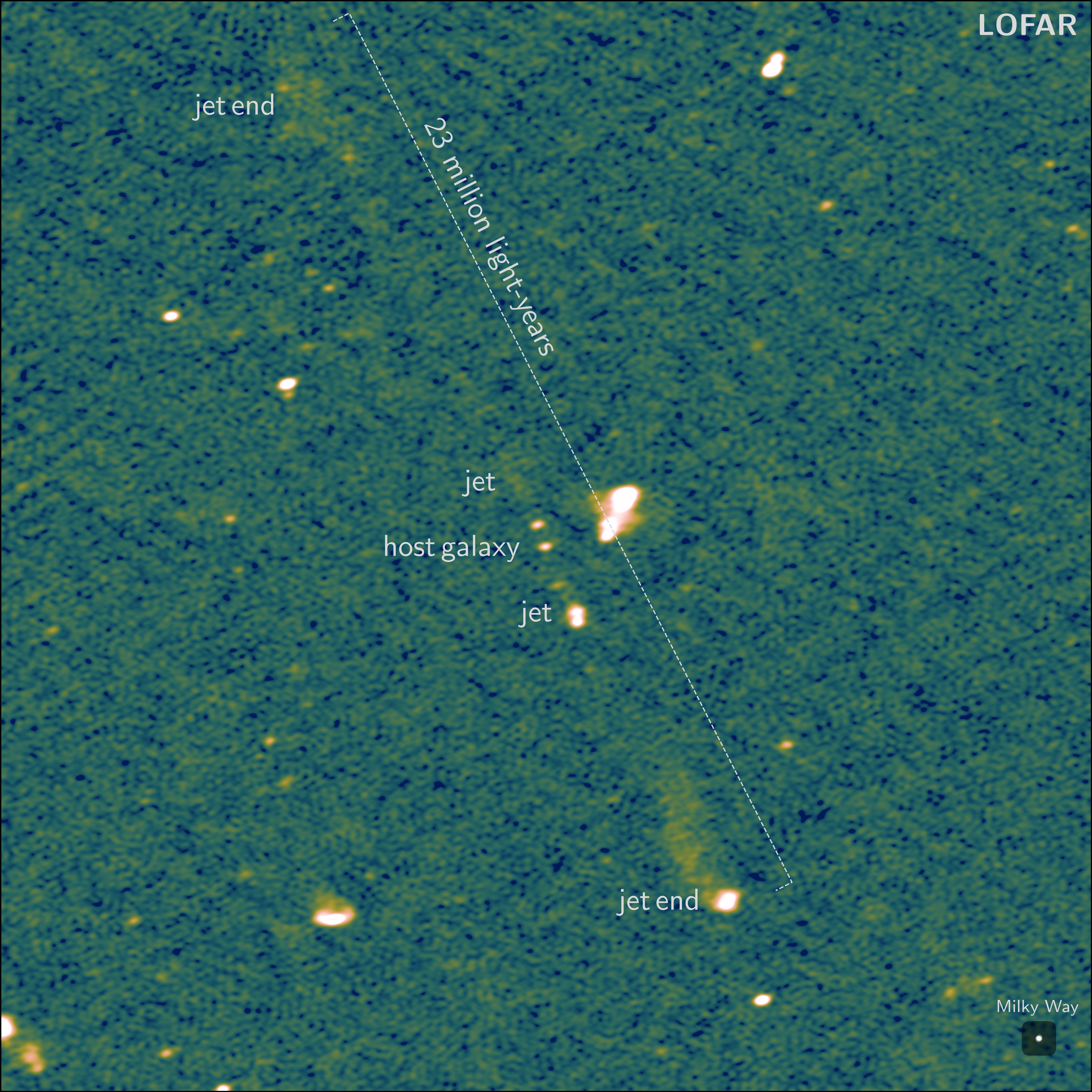
- Radio image of Porphyrion, a black hole jet system spanning an estimated 23 million light-years. The image, taken with the LOFAR HBA at a central observing frequency of 144 MHz, has an effective resolution of 6.2" and covers 15' × 15' of sky. The Milky Way (assumed diameter: 50 kpc) is shown for scale.

Observation data (J2000 epoch)
- Constellation: Draco
- Right ascension: 15^{h} 29^{m} 32.16^{s}
- Declination: +60° 15′ 34.4″
- Redshift: 0.896±0.001
- Distance: 7.5 billion light-years
- Notable features: Giant radio galaxy

Other designations
- Porphyrion, J152932.16+601534.4

Porphyrion is a Fanaroff–Riley class II radio galaxy located 7.5 billion light years away from Earth, with host galaxy J152932.16+601534.4. It is located in the constellation Draco and it was discovered in Low-Frequency Array (LOFAR) data by an international team led by Martijn Oei. Porphyrion had the longest jets of any radio galaxy identified to date, with lobed structures spanning 7 megaparsecs (23 million light-years) across, making it the largest known structure of galactic origin at the time of its discovery. In 2024, another radio galaxy designated TXS 0033+252 exceeded Porphyrion in size with an estimated extent of 8 megaparsecs (26 million light years) across.

== Discovery ==
Porphyrion was first reported in a paper in Nature by Martijn Oei (Leiden University/Caltech) and colleagues, which featured on the cover of the 19 September 2024 issue, after obtaining results from the Low Frequency Array (LOFAR) Two-metre Sky Survey (LoTSS), an interferometric radio survey of the Northern Sky. Porphyrion was part of a large number of new giant radio galaxies discovered by this team. The giant black hole jet system was named after Porphyrion, a Giant from Greek mythology, by co-discoverer Aivin Gast from the University of Oxford.

To find the galaxy from which Porphyrion originated, the Giant Metrewave Radio Telescope in India was used along with ancillary data from the Dark Energy Spectroscopic Instrument in Arizona. The observations pinpointed to the galaxy J152932.16+601534.4, which is about 10 times more massive than the Milky Way.

== Characteristics ==
The team reporting the discovery described Porphyrion as a 'black hole jets system', rather than a giant radio galaxy, as they considered the latter a confusing term: the jet structure of a radio galaxy is not formally part of the galaxy proper. Radio galaxies are a special class of objects characterized by the presence of radio lobes generated by relativistic jets powered by the central galaxy's supermassive black hole. Giant radio galaxies are different from ordinary radio galaxies in that they can extend to much larger scales, reaching upwards to several megaparsecs across, far larger than the diameters of their host galaxies.

The W. M. Keck Observatory on Hawaii was used to show that Porphyrion is 7.5 billion light-years from Earth, and dates to a time when the universe was 6.3 billion years old. The observations also revealed that Porphyrion emerged from a radiative-mode active black hole, as opposed to one in a jet-mode state. Porphyrion's two jets combined have a jet power of 10^{39} watts, equivalent to the energy output of trillions of suns.

Oei and his colleagues believe that "every place in the universe may have been affected by black hole activity at some point in cosmic time". They suggest that giant jet systems like Porphyrion may have had a larger influence on the formation of galaxies in the young universe than previously believed, and suggest that these giant jets could have spread magnetism through the cosmos.

== See also ==
- List of largest galaxies
- List of largest radio galaxies
- TXS 0033+252, a radio galaxy larger than Porphyrion.
- List of galaxies with notable features
