= NGC 6185 =

Spiral radio galaxy in the constellation Hercules

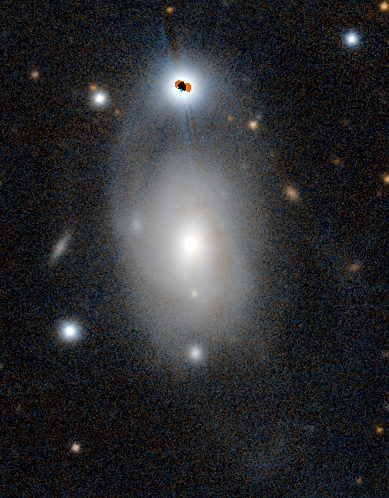
- PanSTARRS DR1 image of NGC 6185

Observation data (J2000 epoch)
- Constellation: Hercules
- Right ascension: 16^{h} 33^{m} 17.83^{s}
- Declination: +35° 20′ 32.43"
- Redshift: 0.034304
- Heliocentric radial velocity: 10108
- Distance: 492.9 mly (152.04 mpc)
- Group or cluster: Abell 2199
- Apparent magnitude (B): 14.5

Characteristics
- Type: Sa
- Mass: 295.1 billion M_{☉}
- Size: 239,400 ly (73,410 pc)
- Apparent size (V): 1.2' x 0.9'

Other designations
- UGC 10444, KUG 1631+354, CGCG 196-077

NGC 6185, also called UGC 10444, is a LINER and spiral galaxy of morphological type Sa. It is at redshift z = 0.034304, equivalent to 152 million parsecs (496 million light-years) away, in the constellation of Hercules, and has an apparent B magnitude of 14.5. The galaxy was discovered in April 1827 by British astronomer John Herschel.

== Physical properties ==
NGC 6185 is a massive spiral Sa galaxy in the galaxy cluster Abell 2199. It is 239,000 light-years (73,000 parsecs) across based on an angular diameter of 1.2 arcmin and a distance of 152 million parsecs (496 million light-years) away. It has a stellar mass of 295.1×10^{9} M_{☉} and is believed to be a starburst galaxy.

It has an active galactic nucleus (AGN) that is also classified as a quasar and is estimated to be extremely bright with a luminosity of 131.5×10^{9} L_{☉}. The active galactic nucleus of NGC 6185 is powered by a 600-million-M_{☉} black hole accreting matter that is ejected far beyond the physical galaxy, forming its immense radio lobes. The central black hole mass is high; however, it is expected for giant radio galaxies (GRGs) and is comparable to similar spiral-hosted radio galaxies such as J2345-0449. It is possible that the active galactic nucleus is inactive and the radio structure is a remnant.

In 2016, an ultraluminous X-ray source was discovered in NGC 6185. It was designated CXOU J163317.7+352018 and has an estimated luminosity of 57.9 million L_{☉}.

LoTSS image of the radio lobes of NGC 6185

In 2022, it was found in the LOFAR Two-metre Sky Survey for giants (LoTSS) that NGC 6185 generated radio lobes spanning ~2.54 megaparsecs, making it the largest known spiral galaxy-hosted radio galaxy. It greatly surpasses the previous largest spiral radio galaxy, J2345-0449, which has an extent of ~1.63 megaparsecs. The radio structure is a Fanaroff-Riley class II radio galaxy which are edge-brightened and far more luminous than their counterpart, and it is also a double lobed radio galaxy, so it is technically classified as a spiral DRAGN. The total exact length of the radio structure is 2.544 million parsecs (8.30×10^{6} ly), comparable to the Local Group and other small galaxy clusters. This estimate is based on an angular diameter of 60 arcmin, which is the second-largest of any GRG.

== See also ==
- List of spiral DRAGNs
- Abell 2199 – the galaxy cluster NGC 6185 is located in
