= 0313−192 =

Galaxy in the constellation Eridanus

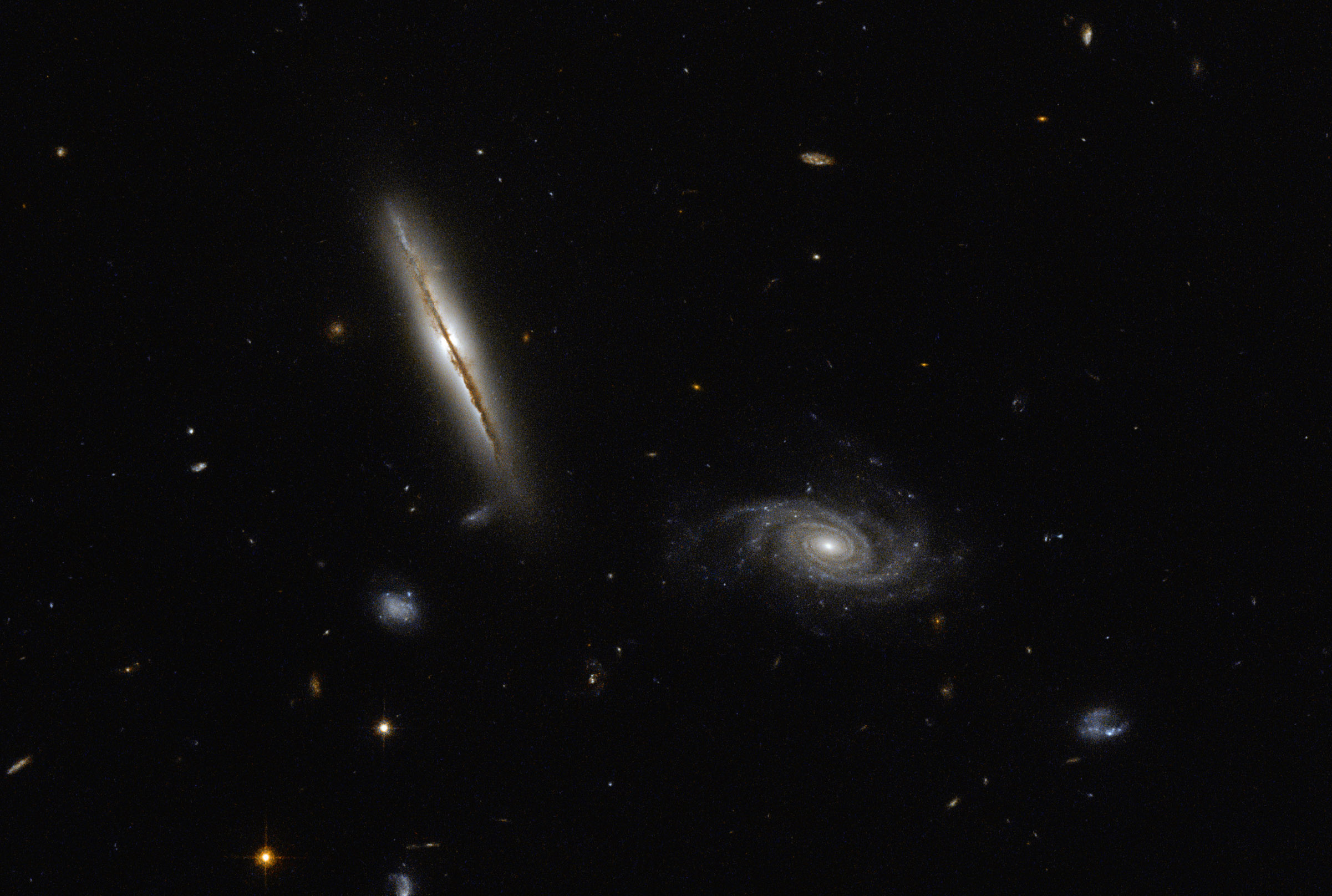
- 0313−192 (left), as taken from Hubble Space Telescope (HST), next to LOY2001 (right)

Observation data (J2000 epoch)
- Constellation: Eridanus
- Right ascension: 03^{h} 15^{m} 51.80^{s}
- Declination: −19° 06′ 45.0″
- Redshift: 0.067±0.0002
- Distance: 1 Bly (225.9 Mpc)
- Group or cluster: Abell 428
- Apparent magnitude (V): 17.48

Characteristics
- Type: SA(s)ca (spiral radio galaxy)
- Size: 1.5 million ly (radio lobe(s))
- Apparent size (V): 0.69 x 0.14
- Notable features: active galactic nuclei

Other designations
- LEDA 97372, 2MASX J03155208−1906442, NVSS J031552−190638, [LO95] 0313−192

0313−192 (also known as PGC 97372 and LO95 0313−192) is an edge-on spiral galaxy, or a double-lobed radio galaxy located around 1 billion light-years away in the constellation Eridanus. Its radio jets were discovered in 2003 by NASA, and its radio lobes are an estimated 1.5 million light years in diameter. It is part of the cluster Abell 428, and it has an active galactic nuclei.

== Characteristics ==
0313−192 has a spiral shape similar to that of the Milky Way. It has a large central bulge, and arms speckled with brightly glowing gas inhabited by thick lanes of dark dust. Its companion, sitting pretty in the right of the frame, is known rather unpoetically as [LOY2001] J031549.8−190623.

Jets, outbursts of superheated gas moving at close to the speed of light, have long been associated with the cores of giant elliptical galaxies, and galaxies in the process of merging. However, in an unexpected discovery, astronomers found 0313−192 to have intense radio jets spewing out from its central supermassive black hole. The galaxy appears to have two more regions that are also strongly emitting in the radio part of the spectrum, making it even rarer still.

The discovery of these giant jets in 2003, not visible in this image, but indicated in this earlier Hubble composite, has been followed by the unearthing of a further three spiral galaxies containing radio-emitting jets in recent years. This growing class of unusual spirals continues to raise significant questions about how jets are produced within galaxies, and how they are thrown out into the cosmos.

== Nucleus ==
The core of 0313−192 is rather bright as seen in the Hubble Composite. The central supermassive black hole of 0313−192 is known to be highly active, indicating the unusually luminous bulge in the center of the galaxy. A disklike emission-line structure is seen around the nucleus, inclined by ~20° to the stellar disk but nearly perpendicular to the jets. This may represent the aftermath of a galaxy encounter in which gas is photoionized by a direct view of the nuclear continuum. The SMBH has a mass of ~8×10^{8} M_{☉}.

== Properties ==
Nearly all classic double-lobed radio galaxies have either an elliptical galaxy or some galactic merger at their center. However, there is one remarkable exception to this rule. In 2003, astronomers confirmed that 0313−192, flanked by large, bright clouds of radio emissions, is in fact an edge-on spiral galaxy.

=== Twisted Disc ===
If you look closely enough, 0313−192's dark plane of dust is distinctly twisted. This may be due to a collision or a near pass-by with a smaller galaxy, which may have sparked the galaxy's nucleus to life.

== Gallery ==
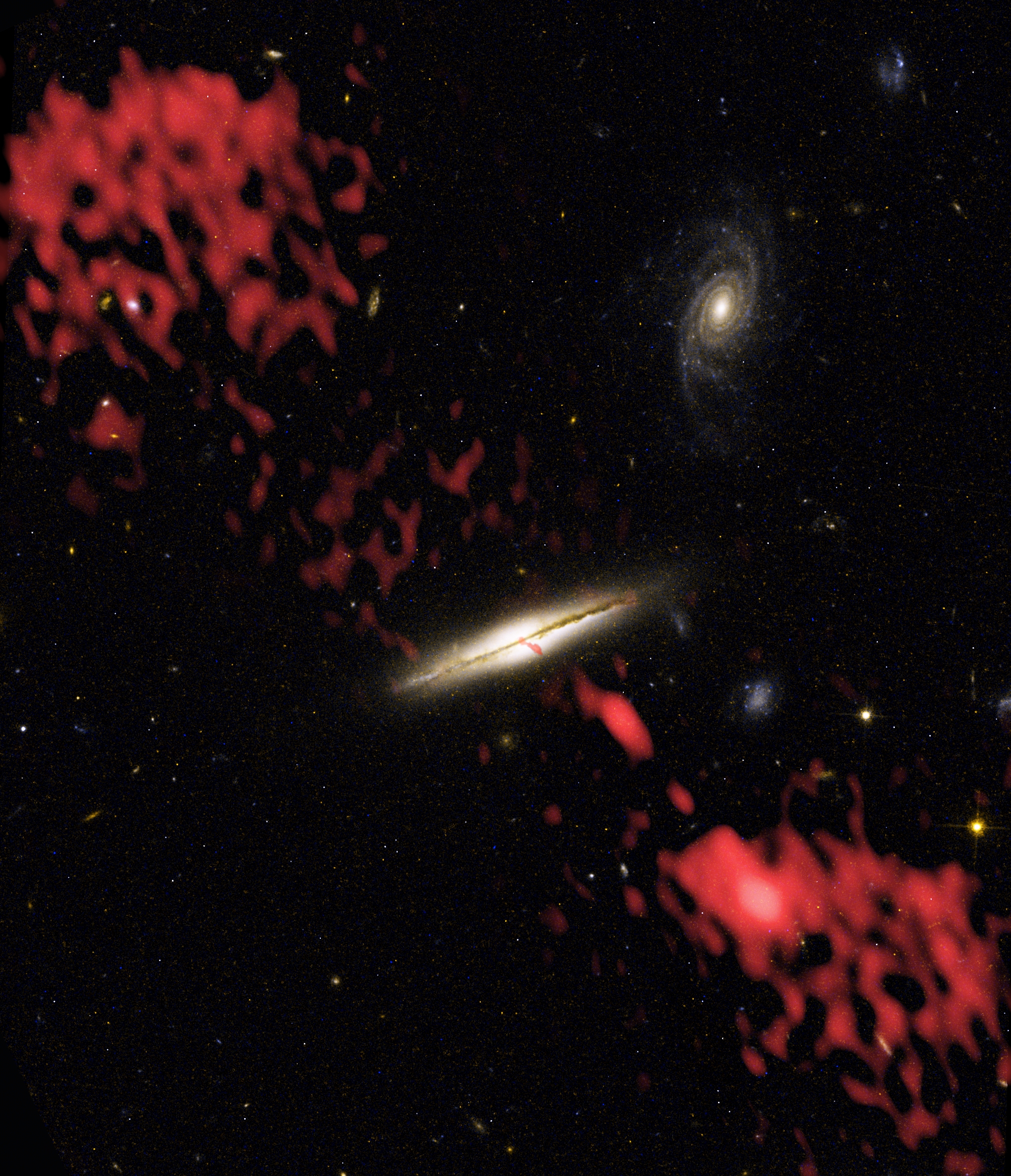
Radio Map image of Hubble's Advanced Camera for Surveys with a radio map from the Very Large Array

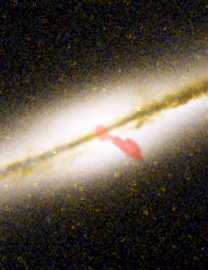
A twisted disc is visible
