= 3C 236 =

Galaxy in the constellation Leo Minor

3C 236 North
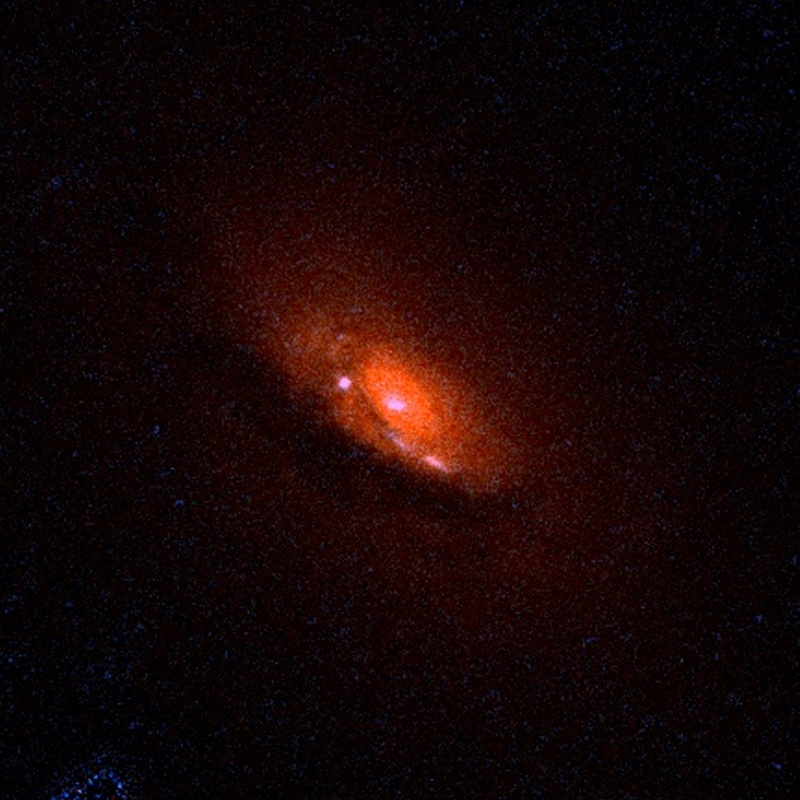
- 3C 236, imaged by the Hubble Space Telescope, 10.8 arcseconds (") view (NASA/STScI/WikiSky)

Observation data (J2000 epoch)
- Constellation: Leo Minor
- Right ascension: 10^{h} 06^{m} 01.7^{s}
- Declination: +34° 54′ 10″
- Redshift: 0.099358±0.000020
- Heliocentric radial velocity: 29,786.783215±5.995850 km/s
- Galactocentric velocity: 29,763±6 km/s
- Distance: 442.9 ± 31.0 Mpc (1,445 ± 101.1 Mly)h^{−1}_{0.6774} (Comoving); 409.6 ± 0.09198 Mpc (1.33584 ± 0.0003 Gly)h^{−1}_{0.6774} (Light-travel)
- Apparent magnitude (V): 16.357 (g)
- Apparent magnitude (B): 15.97

Characteristics
- Type: WLRG;LERG
- Size: 394,290 ly × 268,130 ly (120.89 kpc × 82.21 kpc) (diameter; 2MASS K-band total isophote); 245,300 ly × 218,300 ly (75.20 kpc × 66.93 kpc) (diameter; SDSS D_{25.0} B-band isophote) (Note: The quoted diameters in this infobox were based on NED's provided scale "Virgo + GA + Shapley" of 2.147 kpc/arcsec multiplied with given angular diameters.)
- Apparent size (V): 0′.46 × 0′.38

Other designations
- PGC 29329, LEDA 29329, 7C 1003+3508, 4C 35.22

3C 236 is the name used for this Fanaroff and Riley Class II (FR II) radio galaxy. It is among the largest known radio galaxies; the radio structure has a total linear size in excess of 4.5 Mpc (15 million light years). The galaxy features a "double-double" radio morphology consisting of the giant relic 4.5 Mpc source and an inner 2 kpc compact steep spectrum radio source. A recent starburst episode near the nucleus may be related to the event resulting in re-ignition of radio activity.
