= Radio galaxy =

Type of active galaxy that is very luminous at radio wavelengths

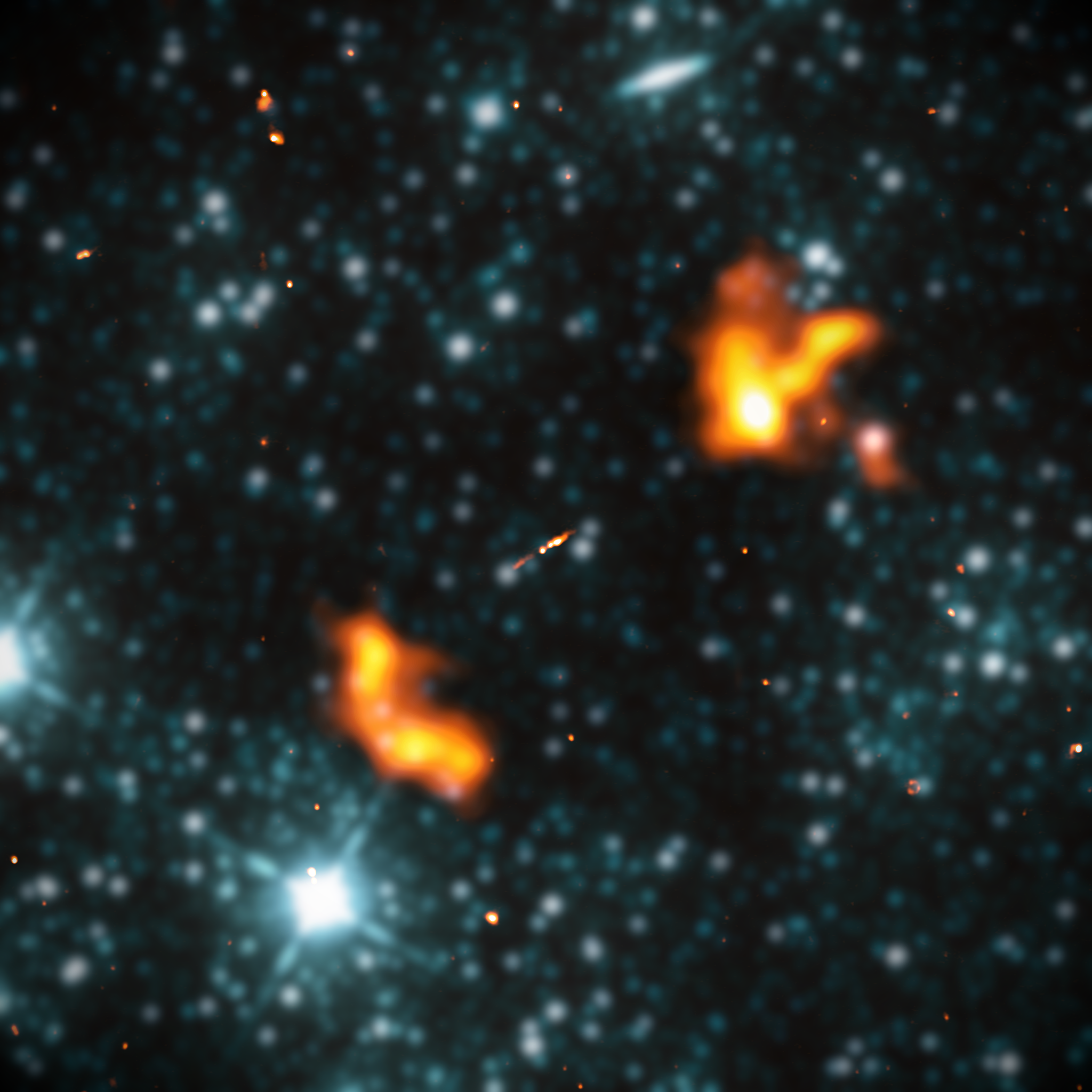
Alcyoneus, a giant radio galaxy with lobed structures spanning 5 megaparsecs (16 million ly).

A radio galaxy is a galaxy with giant regions of radio emission extending well beyond its visible structure. These energetic radio lobes are powered by jets from its active galactic nucleus. They have luminosities up to 10^{39} W at radio wavelengths between 10 MHz and 100 GHz. The radio emission is due to the synchrotron process. The observed structure in radio emission is determined by the interaction between twin jets and the external medium, modified by the effects of relativistic beaming. The host galaxies are almost exclusively large elliptical galaxies. Radio-loud active galaxies can be detected at large distances, making them valuable tools for observational cosmology. Much work has been done on the effects of these objects on the intergalactic medium, particularly in galaxy groups and clusters.

The term "radio galaxy" is often used to refer to the entire jet system, rather than solely to its host galaxy. Some scientists consider the term "black hole jet system" more accurate and less confusing. Radio galaxies that reach the size of around 0.7 megaparsecs or more, are commonly called "giant radio galaxies".

== Emission processes ==
The radio emission from radio-loud active galaxies is synchrotron emission, as inferred from its very smooth, broad-band nature and strong polarization. This implies that the radio-emitting plasma contains, at least, electrons with relativistic speeds (Lorentz factors of ~10^{4}) and magnetic fields. Since the plasma must be neutral, it must also contain either protons or positrons. There is no way of determining the particle content directly from observations of synchrotron radiation. Moreover, there is no way to determine the energy densities in particles and magnetic fields from observation: the same synchrotron emissivity may be a result of a few electrons and a strong field, or a weak field and many electrons, or something in between. It is possible to determine a minimum energy condition which is the minimum energy density that a region with a given emissivity can have, but for many years there was no particular reason to believe that the true energies were anywhere near the minimum energies.

A sister process to the synchrotron radiation is the inverse-Compton process, in which the relativistic electrons interact with ambient photons and Thomson scatter them to high energies. Inverse-Compton emission from radio-loud sources turns out to be particularly important in X-rays, and, because it depends only on the density of electrons, a detection of inverse-Compton scattering allows a somewhat model-dependent estimate of the energy densities in the particles and magnetic fields. This has been used to argue that many powerful sources are actually quite near the minimum-energy condition.

Synchrotron radiation is not confined to radio wavelengths: if the radio source can accelerate particles to high enough energies, features that are detected in the radio wavelengths may also be seen in the infrared, optical, ultraviolet or even X-ray. In the latter case the responsible electrons must have energies in excess of 1 TeV in typical magnetic field strengths. Again, polarization and continuum spectrum are used to distinguish the synchrotron radiation from other emission processes. Jets and hotspots are the usual sources of high-frequency synchrotron emission. It is hard to distinguish observationally between the synchrotron and inverse-Compton radiation, making them a subject of ongoing research.

Processes, collectively known as particle acceleration, produce populations of relativistic and non-thermal particles that give rise to synchrotron and inverse-Compton radiation. Fermi acceleration is one plausible particle acceleration process in radio-loud active galaxies.

== Radio structures ==
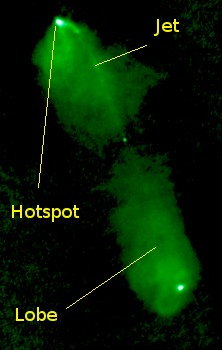
Pseudo-colour image of the large-scale radio structure of the FRII radio galaxy 3C98. Lobes, jet and hotspot are labelled.

Radio galaxies, and to a lesser extent, radio-loud quasars display a wide range of structures in radio maps. The most common large-scale structures are called lobes: these are double, often fairly symmetrical, roughly ellipsoidal structures placed on either side of the active nucleus. A significant minority of low-luminosity sources exhibit structures usually known as plumes which are much more elongated. Some radio galaxies show one or two long narrow features known as jets (the most famous example being the giant galaxy M87 in the Virgo Cluster) coming directly from the nucleus and going to the lobes. Since the 1970s, the most widely accepted model has been that the lobes or plumes are powered by beams of high-energy particles and magnetic field coming from close to the active nucleus. The jets are believed to be the visible manifestations of the beams, and often the term jet is used to refer both to the observable feature and to the underlying flow.

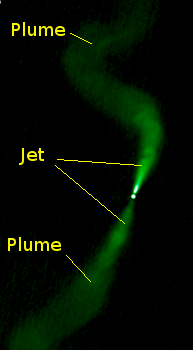
Pseudo-colour image of the large-scale radio structure of the FRI radio galaxy 3C31. Jets and plumes are labelled.

In 1974, radio sources were divided by Bernard Fanaroff and Julia Riley into two classes, now known as Fanaroff and Riley Class I (FRI) and Class II (FRII). The distinction was originally made based on the morphology of the large-scale radio emission (the type was determined by the distance between the brightest points in the radio emission): FRI sources were brightest towards the centre, while FRII sources were brightest at the edges. Fanaroff and Riley observed that there was a reasonably sharp divide in luminosity between the two classes: FRIs were low-luminosity, FRIIs were high luminosity. With more detailed radio observations, the morphology turns out to reflect the method of energy transport in the radio source. FRI objects typically have bright jets in the centre, while FRIIs have faint jets but bright hotspots at the ends of the lobes. FRIIs appear to be able to transport energy efficiently to the ends of the lobes, while FRI beams are inefficient in the sense that they radiate a significant amount of their energy away as they travel.

In more detail, the FRI/FRII division depends on host-galaxy environment in the sense that the FRI/FRII transition appears at higher luminosity in more massive galaxies. FRI jets are known to be decelerating in the regions in which their radio emission is brightest, and so it seems that the FRI/FRII transition reflects whether a jet/beam can propagate through the host galaxy without being decelerated to sub-relativistic speeds by interaction with the intergalactic medium. From analysis of relativistic beaming effects, the jets of FRII sources are known to remain relativistic (with speeds of at least 0.5c) out to the ends of the lobes. The hotspots that are usually seen in FRII sources are interpreted as being the visible manifestations of shocks formed when the supersonic jet abruptly terminates at the end of the source, and their spectral energy distributions are consistent with this picture. Often multiple hotspots are seen, reflecting either continued outflow after the shock or movement of the jet termination point: the overall hotspot region is sometimes called the hotspot complex.

Names are given to several particular types of radio source based on their radio structure:

- Classical double refers to an FRII source with clear hotspots.
- Wide-angle tail normally refers to a source intermediate between standard FRI and FRII structure, with efficient jets and sometimes hotspots, but with plumes rather than lobes, found at or near the centres of clusters.
- Narrow-angle tail or Head-tail source describes an FRI that appears to be bent by ram pressure as it moves through a cluster.
- Fat doubles are sources with diffuse lobes but neither jets nor hotspots. Some such sources may be relics whose energy supply has been permanently or temporarily turned off.

== Life cycles and dynamics ==
The largest radio galaxies have lobes or plumes extending to megaparsec scales (more in the case of giant radio galaxies like 3C236), implying a timescale for growth of the order of tens to hundreds of millions of years. This means that, except in the case of very small, very young sources, we cannot observe radio source dynamics directly, and so must resort to theory and inferences from large numbers of objects. Clearly, radio sources must start small and grow larger. In the case of sources with lobes, the dynamics are fairly simple: the jets feed the lobes, the pressure of the lobes increases and the lobes expand. How fast they expand depends on the density and pressure of the external medium. The highest-pressure phase of the external medium, and thus the most important phase from the point of view of the dynamics, is the X-ray emitting diffuse hot gas. For a long time, it was assumed that powerful sources would expand supersonically, pushing a shock through the external medium. However, X-ray observations show that the internal lobe pressures of powerful FRII sources are often close to the external thermal pressures and not much higher than the external pressures, as would be required for supersonic expansion. The only unambiguously supersonically expanding system known consists of the inner lobes of the low-power radio galaxy Centaurus A which are probably a result of a comparatively recent outburst of the active nucleus.

== Host galaxies and environments ==
These radio sources are almost always found hosted by elliptical galaxies. Some nearby Seyfert galaxies show weak, small radio jets, but they are neither luminous enough, in radio bands, to be classified as radio-loud nor they are 10-100 times larger than the host spiral galaxies to be comparable to standard radio galaxies. Some observations about the host galaxies of radio-loud quasars and blazars suggest that they are also hosted by elliptical galaxies. There are several possible reasons for this very strong preference for ellipticals. One is that ellipticals generally contain the most massive black holes, and so are capable of powering the most luminous active galaxies (see Eddington luminosity). Another is that ellipticals generally inhabit richer environments, providing a large-scale intergalactic medium to confine the radio source. It may also be that the larger amounts of cold gas in spiral galaxies in some way disrupts or stifles a forming jet. To date there is no compelling single explanation for the observations.

However, since the discovery of the exotic radio galaxy Speca in the year 2011 the number of large-scale radio galaxies hosted in disk/spiral galaxies have been steadily growing. The first such odd-ball radio galaxy was discovered in 1998, namely J0313-192 in the Abell 428 cluster of galaxies. Possibly due to availability of new sensitive radio and optical all sky surveys the number of such Speca-like objects or Spiral-DRAGNs have increased to up to three dozens. Speca-like such radio galaxies can launch not only giant mega-parsec scale lobes but also be episodic in their nature hosting two pairs of relativistic magnetised plasma lobes. The host spiral galaxies can also be extremely massive spirals and mostly are red in optical colour compared to typical spiral galaxies. It has been speculated that such galaxies may be more common in early Universe when there were less number of ellipticals than spirals.

== Unified models ==
The different types of radio-loud active galaxies are linked by unified models. The key observation that led to the adoption of unified models for powerful radio galaxies and radio-loud quasars was that all quasars appear to be beamed towards us, showing superluminal motion in the cores and bright jets on the side of the source nearest to us (the Laing-Garrington effect:). If this is the case, there must be a population of objects not beamed towards us, and, since we know the lobes are not affected by beaming, they would appear as radio galaxies, provided that the quasar nucleus is obscured when the source is seen side-on. It is now accepted that at least some powerful radio galaxies have 'hidden' quasars, though it is not clear whether all such radio galaxies would be quasars if viewed from the right angle. In a similar way, low-power radio galaxies are a plausible parent population for BL Lac objects.

== Uses of radio galaxies ==
=== Distant sources ===
Radio galaxies and radio-loud quasars have been widely used, particularly in the 80s and 90s, to find distant galaxies: by selecting based on radio spectrum and then observing the host galaxy it was possible to find objects at high redshift at modest cost in telescope time. The problem with this method is that hosts of active galaxies may not be typical of galaxies at their redshift. Similarly, radio galaxies have in the past been used to find distant X-ray emitting clusters, but unbiased selection methods are now preferred. The most distant radio galaxy currently known is TGSS J1530+1049, at a redshift of 5.72.

=== Standard rulers ===
Some work has been done attempting to use radio galaxies as standard rulers to determine cosmological parameters. This method is fraught with difficulty because a radio galaxy's size depends on both its age and its environment. When a model of the radio source is used, though, methods based on radio galaxies can give good agreement with other cosmological observations.

=== Effects on environment ===
Whether or not a radio source is expanding supersonically, it must do work against the external medium in expanding, and so it puts energy into heating and lifting the external plasma. The minimum energy stored in the lobes of a powerful radio source might be 10^{53} J. The lower limit on the work done on the external medium by such a source is several times this. A good deal of the current interest in radio sources focuses on the effect they must have at the centres of clusters at the present day. Equally interesting is their likely effect on structure formation over cosmological time: it is thought that they may provide a feedback mechanism to slow the formation of the most massive objects.

== Terminology ==
Widely used terminology is awkward now that it is generally accepted that quasars and radio galaxies are the same objects (see above). The acronym DRAGN (for "Double Radiosource Associated with Galactic Nucleus") was coined by Patrick Leahy in 1993 and is in use. Extragalactic radio source is common but can lead to confusion, since many other extragalactic objects are detected in radio surveys, notably starburst galaxies. Radio-loud active galaxy is unambiguous, and so is often used in this article.

== See also ==
- Relativistic jet
- X-shaped radio galaxy
- List of spiral DRAGNs
- M–sigma relation
- Death Star Galaxy
- ESO 0313-192
