= NGC 789 =

Galaxy in the constellation Triangulum

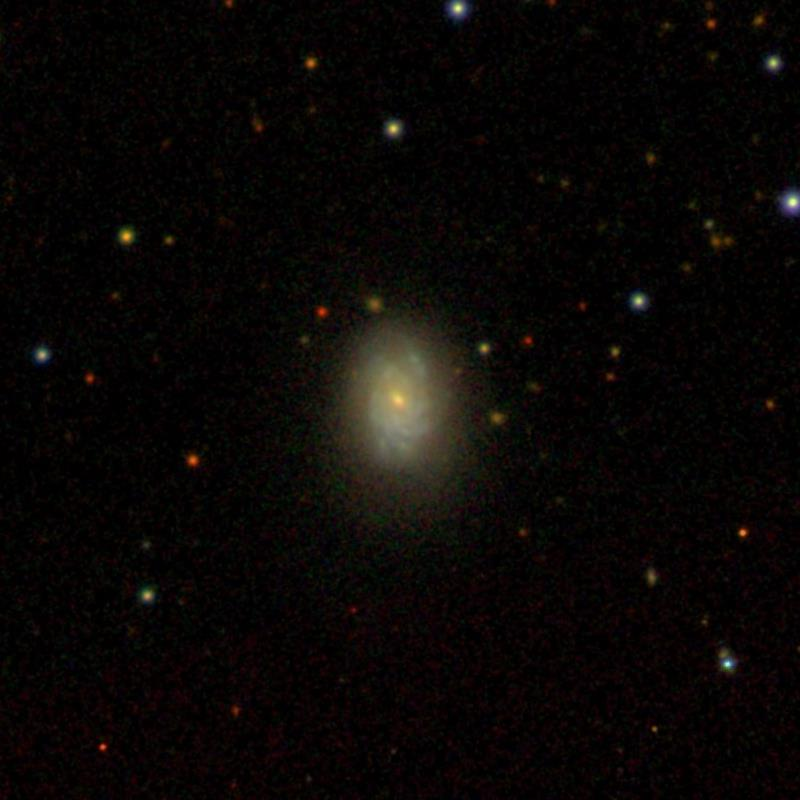
- NGC 789 imaged by SDSS

Observation data (J2000 epoch)
- Constellation: Triangulum
- Right ascension: 02^{h} 02^{m} 26.0531^{s}
- Declination: +32° 04′ 20.225″
- Redshift: 0.017569±0.0000270
- Heliocentric radial velocity: 5,267±8 km/s
- Distance: 241.2 ± 16.9 Mly (73.94 ± 5.19 Mpc)
- Group or cluster: NGC 777 group (LGG 42)
- Apparent magnitude (V): 14.40

Characteristics
- Type: S
- Size: ~83,500 ly (25.61 kpc) (estimated)
- Apparent size (V): 0.6′ × 0.4′

Other designations
- IRAS 01595+3149, 2MASX J02022599+3204199, UGC 1520, MCG +05-05-047, PGC 7760, CGCG 503-077

NGC 789 is a spiral galaxy in the constellation of Triangulum. Its velocity with respect to the cosmic microwave background is 5,013±20 km/s, which corresponds to a Hubble distance of 241.2 ± 16.9 Mly (73.94 ± 5.19 Mpc). It was discovered by German astronomer Heinrich Louis d'Arrest on 24 August 1865.

NGC 789 has a possible active galactic nucleus, i.e. it has a compact region at the center of a galaxy that emits a significant amount of energy across the electromagnetic spectrum, with characteristics indicating that this luminosity is not produced by the stars.

== NGC 777 group ==
NGC 789 is a member of the NGC 777 Group (also known as LGG 42). There are 13 galaxies in the group, including NGC 750, NGC 751, NGC 761, NGC 777, NGC 783, and NGC 785.

== Supernovae ==
Two supernovae have been observed in NGC 789:

- SN 2004ad (type unknown, mag. 17.0) was discovered by British amateur astronomer Mark Armstrong on 1 March 2004.
- SN 2026ovz (Type II, mag. 16.1125) was discovered by the Zwicky Transient Facility on 10 June 2026.

== See also ==
- List of NGC objects (1–1000)
