= Stoney (name) =

Stoney is a given name, nickname, stage name and surname. Notable people with the name include:

== Given name, nickname or stage name ==
- Stoney Burke (born 1953), American street performer and actor
- Stoney Case (born 1972), American football quarterback
- Stoney Cooper (1918–1977), American fiddle and guitar player
- Stoney Curtis, American pornographic actor, director and producer
- Stoney Edwards (1929–1997), American singer
- Peter Emshwiller (born 1959), American novelist, artist, magazine editor, filmmaker, screenwriter and actor
- Stoney Jackson (born 1960), American actor
- Stoney McGlynn (1872–1941), American baseball player
- Stoney LaRue (born 1977), American singer-songwriter
- Carl Stonehewer (born 1972), English former motorcycle speedway ride
- Stoney Willis (1912–1994), American football quarterback
- Stoney Woodson (born 1985), American football cornerback
- Stoney, character in Encino Man

== Surname ==
- A. Burnet Stoney (1892–1973), American football coach
- Andrew Robinson Stoney (1747–1810), Anglo-Irish adventurer
- Bindon Blood Stoney (1828–1909), Irish engineer
- Casey Stoney (born 1982), English association football player
- Clementine Stoney (born 1981), Australian swimmer
- Edith Anne Stoney (1869–1938), Anglo-Irish medical physicist
- Florence Stoney (1870–1932), Irish radiologist
- Francis Goold Morony Stoney (1837–1897), Irish engineer
- George C. Stoney (1916–2012), American filmmaker and film educator
- George Johnstone Stoney (1826–1911), Anglo-Irish physicist
- Graeme Stoney (born 1940), Australian politician
- James M. Stoney (1888–1965), American bishop
- Jim Stoney (1888–1965), American football guard, coach, and church rector
- Kevin Stoney (1921–2008), English actor
- Larry Stoney (born 1937), American politician from Nebraska
- Levar Stoney (born 1981), American politician from Virginia
- Thomas Porcher Stoney (1889–1973), American politician from South Carolina
- William Stoney (1898–1980), British swimmer
