= NGC 380 =

Elliptical galaxy in the constellation Pisces

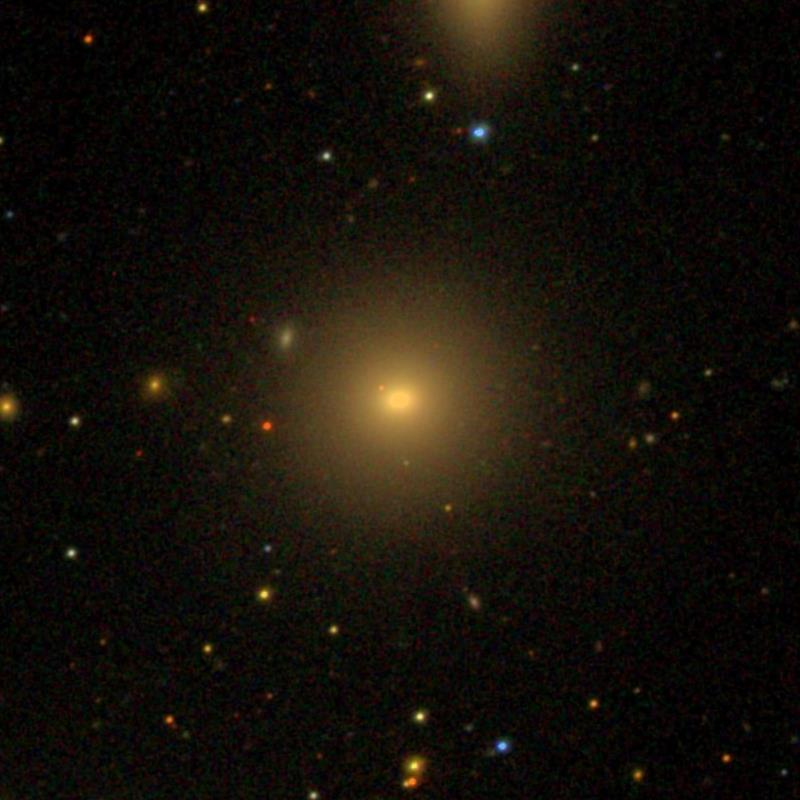
- SDSS image of NGC 380

Observation data (J2000 epoch)
- Constellation: Pisces
- Right ascension: 01^{h} 07^{m} 17.6^{s}
- Declination: +32° 28′ 59″
- Redshift: 0.014764
- Heliocentric radial velocity: 4,426 km/s
- Apparent magnitude (V): 13.60

Characteristics
- Type: E2
- Apparent size (V): 1.4' × 1.2'

Other designations
- UGC 00682, CGCG 501-081, MCG +05-03-051, 2MASX J01071757+3228581, 2MASXi J0107176+322858, PGC 3969.

NGC 380 is an elliptical galaxy located in the constellation Pisces. It was discovered on September 12, 1784 by William Herschel. It was described by Dreyer as "pretty faint, small, round, suddenly brighter middle."

Along with galaxies NGC 375, NGC 379, NGC 382, NGC 383, NGC 384, NGC 385, NGC 386, NGC 387 and NGC 388, NGC 380 forms a galaxy cluster called Arp 331. It is part of the Lyons Groups of Galaxies catalog, forming one of the 3 members of LGG 17. LGG 17's members are NGC 384 and UGC 714.
