= NGC 739 =

Galaxy in the constellation Triangulum

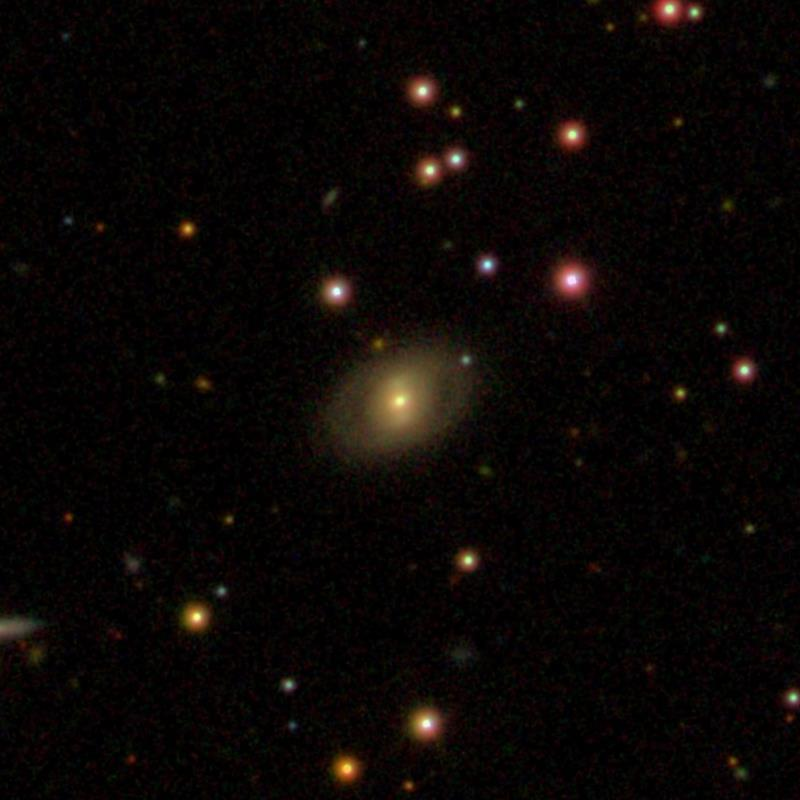
- NGC 739 (SDSS)

Observation data (J2000.0 epoch)
- Constellation: Triangulum
- Right ascension: 01^{h} 56^{m} 54.70^{s}
- Declination: +33° 16′ 00.00″
- Redshift: 0.015104
- Heliocentric radial velocity: 4528 ± 34 km/s
- Distance: 193 Mly
- Apparent magnitude (V): 14.10
- Apparent magnitude (B): 15.00

Characteristics
- Type: S0-a
- Apparent size (V): 0.9 x 0.6

Other designations
- PGC 7312, MCG +05-05-030

NGC 739 is a spiral galaxy approximately 193 million light-years away from Earth in the constellation of Triangulum.

== Observational history ==
NGC 739 was discovered by English astronomer Ralph Copeland on January 9, 1874. He was using the 72" telescope at Birr Castle in an observation of Arp 166, which is composed of two interacting galaxies NGC 750 and NGC 751. Copeland reported the wrong direction of the newly observed galaxy, but gave the correct orientation as PA 292° (WNW) and separation 524" (8.7'). Because of his error the derived position was in error and this was copied into the NGC Catalogue.

In 1913 American astronomer Heber Curtis noted there was nothing at that position and suggested MCG +05-05-030 was in fact NGC 739, based on Edward Crossley's photographs taken at Lick Observatory.

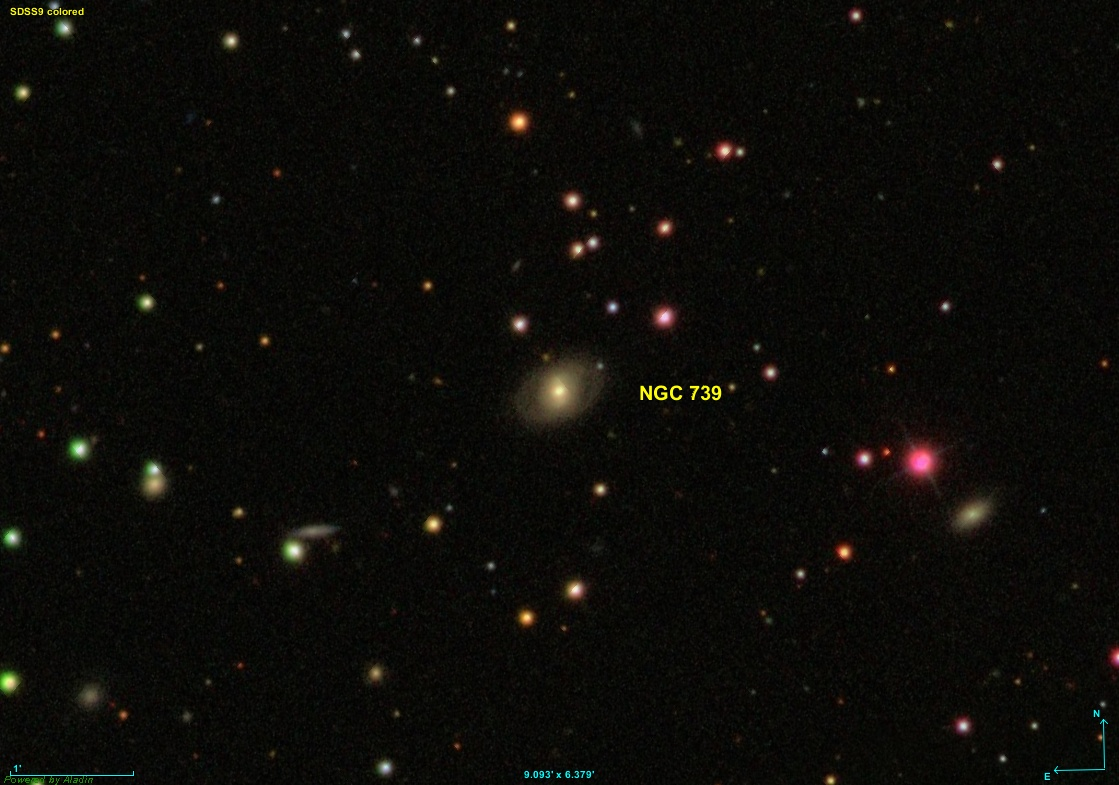
NGC 739 (SDSS)

== See also ==
- Spiral galaxy
- List of NGC objects (1–1000)
- Triangulum (constellation)
