= NGC 5471 =

Nebula in the constellation Ursa Major

Nebula
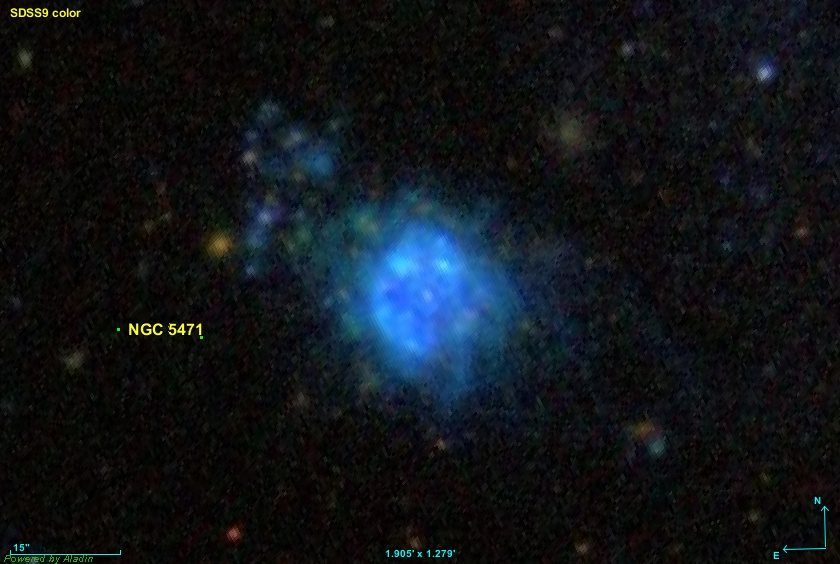

Observation data: J2000 epoch
- Right ascension: 14h 04m 28s
- Declination: +54° 23’ 48”
- Apparent magnitude (V): 14.54

NGC 5471 is an emission nebula (HII region) located in Messier 101 (the Pinwheel Galaxy) towards the constellation Ursa Major. Eight other regions of Messier 101 are listed in the New General Catalogue, namely NGC 5447, NGC 5449, NGC 5450, NGC 5451, NGC 5453, NGC 5458, NGC 5461 and NGC 5462. Three of these regions were discovered by William Herschel (NGC 5447, NGC 5461 and NGC 5462) and the other six by Bindon Stoney.

NGC 5471 is however, unlike the nine other regions discovered by Herschel and Stoney, located on the outskirts of M101 and it was later discovered by d'Arrest in 1863. Furthermore, there is no agreement on its nature. For the Simbad database, it is a galaxy and for Professor Seligman, it is a cloud of stars. The HyperLeda database indicates the PG rating for NGC 5471, therefore part of the galaxy. As for the NASA/IPAC database, it is mentioned that it is an HII region, but further on it is indicated under the morphology section that it is a Wolf-Rayet galaxy.

== See also ==
- List of NGC objects (5001–6000)
- Lists of nebulae
