= NGC 384 =

Galaxy in the constellation of Pisces

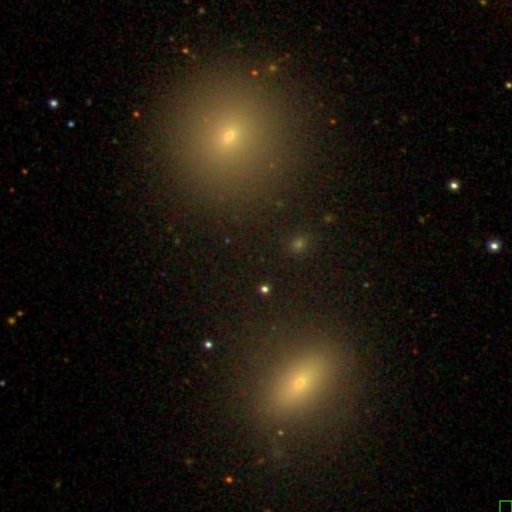
- SDSS image of NGC 384 (NGC 385 is in the top center)

Observation data (J2000 epoch)
- Constellation: Pisces
- Right ascension: 01^{h} 07^{m} 25.1^{s}
- Declination: +32° 17′ 33″
- Redshift: 0.014120
- Heliocentric radial velocity: 4,233 km/s
- Apparent magnitude (V): 14.05

Characteristics
- Type: E3
- Apparent size (V): 1.1' × 0.9'

Other designations
- UGC 00686, CGCG 501-084, MCG +05-03-055, 2MASX J01072503+3217341, 2MASXi J0107250+321734, PGC 3983.

NGC 384 is an elliptical galaxy located in the constellation Pisces. It was discovered on November 4, 1850, by Bindon Stoney. It was described by Dreyer as "pretty faint, pretty small, southwestern of 2.", the other being NGC 385. Along with galaxies NGC 375, NGC 379, NGC 382, NGC 383, NGC 385, NGC 386, NGC 387 and NGC 388, NGC 384 forms a galaxy cluster called Arp 331.

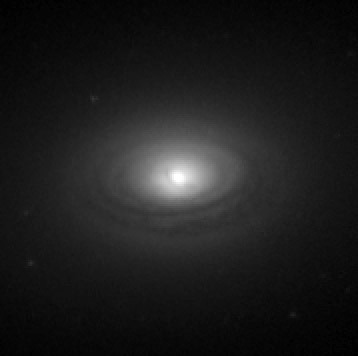
Region around the nucleus of NGC 384 shows circular dust lanes. Image by Hubble WFC3.

NGC 384 is part of a galaxy group called LGG 17, which is part of the Lyon Group Galaxies. LGG 17's members are NGC 380 and UGC 714.
