= NGC 2697 =

Galaxy in the constellation Hydra

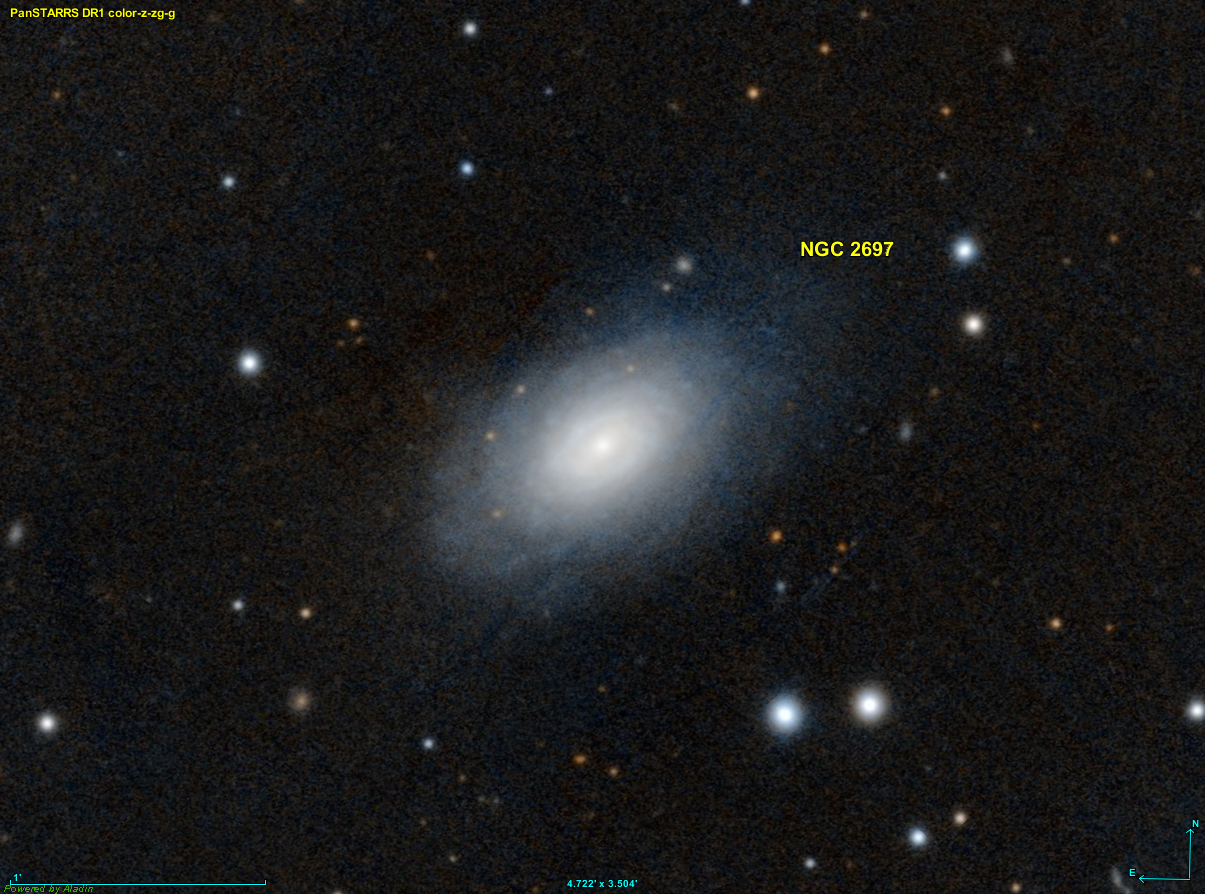
- NGC 2697 imaged by PanSTARRS

Observation data (J2000 epoch)
- Constellation: Hydra
- Right ascension: 08^{h} 54^{m} 59.4027^{s}
- Declination: −02° 59′ 15.016″
- Redshift: 0.006084 ± 0.000013
- Heliocentric radial velocity: 1,824 ± 4 km/s
- Distance: 90 ± 6.2 Mly (27.6 ± 1.9 Mpc)
- Group or cluster: NGC 2698 Group
- Apparent magnitude (V): 12.6

Characteristics
- Type: SA(s)0+
- Size: ~48,000 ly (14.6 kpc) (estimated)
- Apparent size (V): 1.8′ × 1.1′

Other designations
- IRAS 08524-0247, MCG +00-23-011, PGC 25029, CGCG 005-027

NGC 2697 is a lenticular galaxy in the constellation Hydra. The galaxy lies about 90 million light years away from Earth, which means, given its apparent dimensions, that NGC 2697 is approximately 50,000 light years across. It was discovered by Bindon Stoney, assistant of William Parsons, 3rd Earl of Rosse, on January 24, 1851.

== Characteristics ==
NGC 2697 is categorised as an unbarred lenticular galaxy. The galaxy doesn't have a bulge. The gas and stars of the galaxy rotate at different speeds, indicating that they are tilted with respect to each other. The stars at the central 10–15" of the galaxy rotate slower than the stars at the disk, indicating the galaxy has two kinematically decoupled star disks.

The galaxy has a dust ring at 3 arcseconds from the nucleus and an ultraviolet ring located 7 to 11 arcseconds from the nucleus. The stars between the two rings have a mean age of 5–7 billion years. The stars at the nucleus of the galaxy are older. The galaxy probably accreted a dwarf galaxy about 1.5 billion years ago, with the outer disk acquiring some metal poor stars while the gas lead to star formation in the inner disk. The current star formation rate of the galaxy is estimated to be 0.2 M_{☉} per year. Star formation takes place along a ring that is visible in ultraviolet.

== Nearby galaxies ==
NGC 2697 is a member of the NGC 2698 group. Other members of the group include NGC 2695, NGC 2698, NGC 2699, NGC 2708, and NGC 2709. A bit further away lie NGC 2706 and NGC 2690.
