= NGC 2294 =

Elliptical galaxy in the constellation Gemini

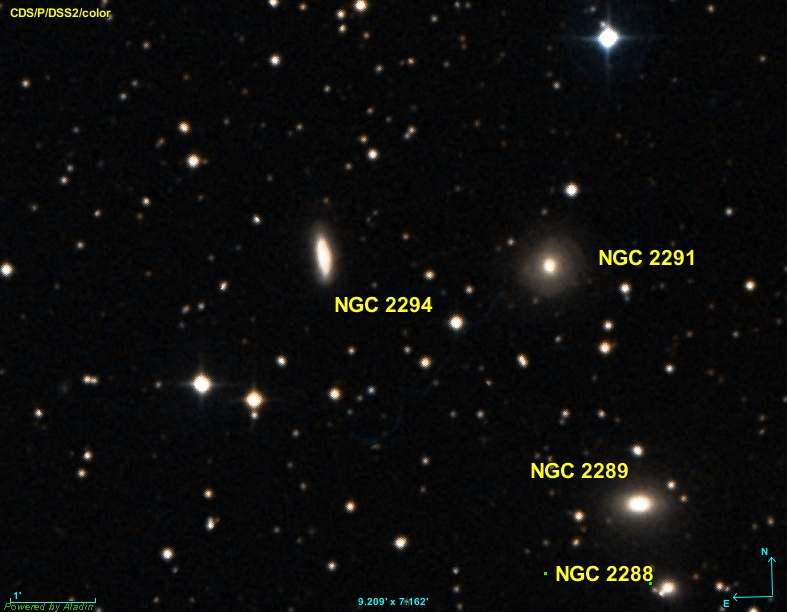

Observation data (J2000 epoch)
- Constellation: Gemini
- Right ascension: 06^{h} 51^{m} 11.3^{s}
- Declination: 33° 31′ 38″

Characteristics
- Type: E6

Other designations
- PGC 19729

NGC 2294 is an elliptical galaxy within the constellation Gemini, discovered by George Johnstone Stoney on February 22, 1849. The visual magnitude is 14, and the apparent size is 0.8 by 0.4 arc minutes.
