= Rocki =

Rocki is a surname. Notable people with the surname include:

- Marek Rocki (born 1953), Polish econometrician
- Piotr Rocki (1974–2020), Polish footballer

== See also ==
- Rocky (nickname)
