= NGC 3908 =

Elliptical galaxy in the constellation Leo

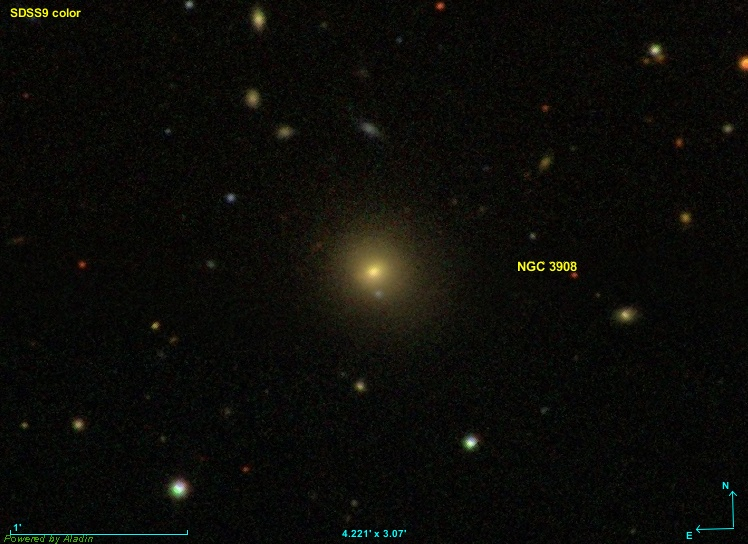

Observation data (J2000.0 epoch)
- Constellation: Leo
- Right ascension: 11h 49m 52.68s
- Declination: +12d 11m 09.30s
- Redshift: 0.083995
- Heliocentric radial velocity: 24,141 km/s
- Distance: 1.23 Gly (377 Mpc)
- Apparent magnitude (V): 15.0
- Apparent magnitude (B): 16.0

Characteristics
- Type: E
- Size: 280,000 ly
- Apparent size (V): 0.4' x 0.4'

Other designations
- PGC 36967, SDSS J114952.68+121109.3, LEDA 36967, NPM1G 12.0292, 2MASX J11495270+1211086

NGC 3908 is one of the furthest NGC objects. It is an elliptical galaxy located 1.2 billion light-years away in the constellation Leo with an estimated diameter of 280,000 thousand light-years. It was discovered on April 10, 1885, by Lewis Swift, who found the object too faint for the naked eye to see. The identification of the celestial object observed by Swift is uncertain. The coordinates (RA 11 49 40.8, Dec +12 04 19) place it approximately 7.5 arcminutes south-southwest of a galaxy previously listed, potentially identifying it as PGC 36967. However, astronomers Corwin and Gottlieb argue that the object is much fainter than Swift's descriptions suggest, indicating it may have been too faint for him to observe. Although the right ascension aligns with another of Swift's discoveries on the same night (NGC 5304), the discrepancy in declination is notably larger. It remains unclear if PGC 36967 is NGC 3908, and it is equally probable that Swift's observed object is "lost," with any nearby galaxy merely coincidental to Swift's original position. Due to its relatively large size, NGC 3908 is considered a brightest cluster galaxy, a BCG.

== See also ==
- List of the most distant astronomical objects
- NGC 5609
