= NGC 258 =

Lenticular galaxy in constellation Andromeda

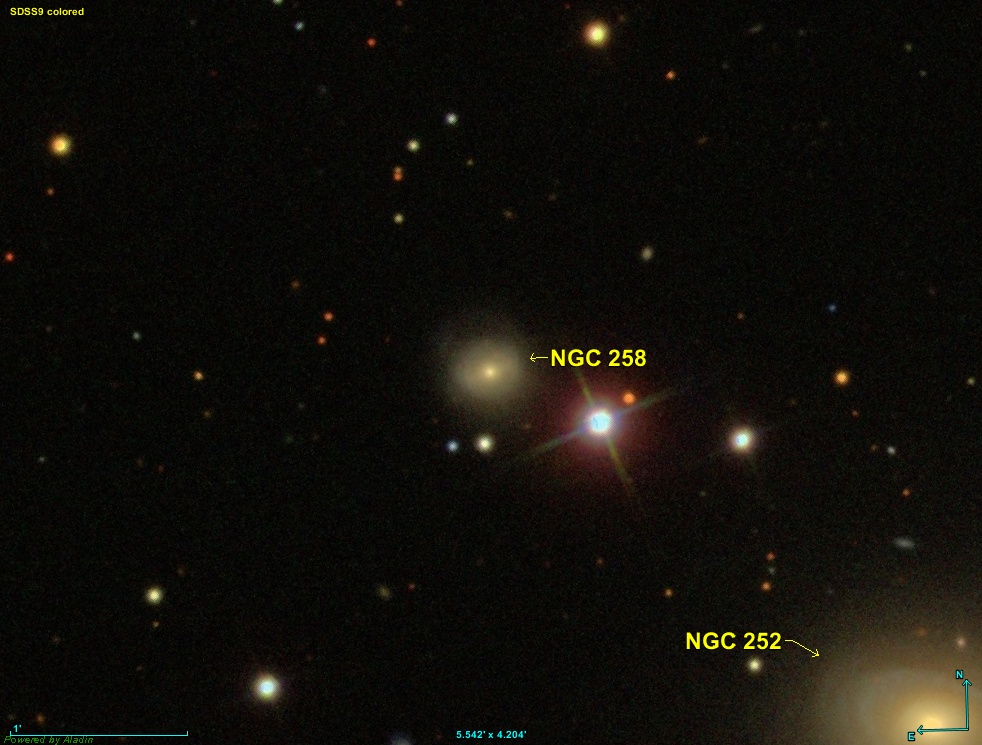
- SDSS image of NGC 258

Observation data (J2000 epoch)
- Constellation: Andromeda
- Right ascension: 00^{h} 48^{m} 12.772^{s}
- Declination: +27° 39′ 25.76″
- Apparent magnitude (B): 15

Characteristics
- Type: S0
- Apparent size (V): 0.65′ × 0.55′

Other designations
- MCG+04-03-005, PGC 2829

NGC 258 is a lenticular galaxy located in the constellation Andromeda. It was discovered by George Stoner in 1848.
