= NGC 318 =

Galaxy in the constellation Pisces

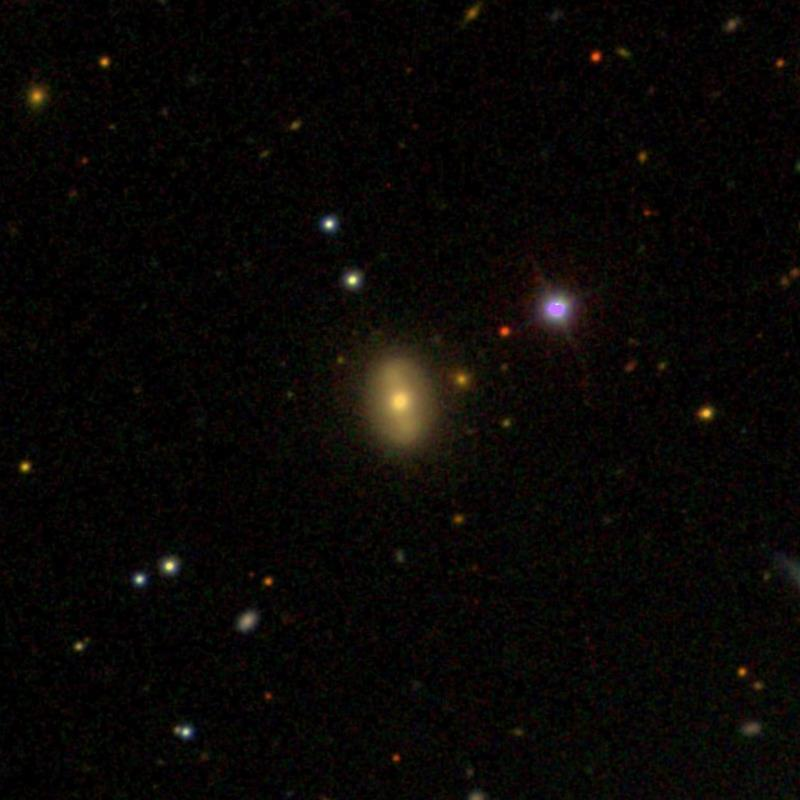
- SDSS image of NGC 318

Observation data (J2000 epoch)
- Constellation: Pisces
- Right ascension: 00^{h} 58^{m} 05.2^{s}
- Declination: +30° 25′ 32″
- Redshift: 0.017702
- Heliocentric radial velocity: 5,307 km/s
- Apparent magnitude (V): 15.2

Characteristics
- Type: S0
- Apparent size (V): 0.50' × 0.20'

Other designations
- CGCG 501-054, 2MASX J00580522+3025323, 2MASXi J0058052+302532, PGC 3465.

NGC 318 is a lenticular galaxy in the constellation Pisces. It was discovered on November 29, 1850 by Bindon Stoney.
