= NGC 4330 =

Galaxy in the constellation Virgo

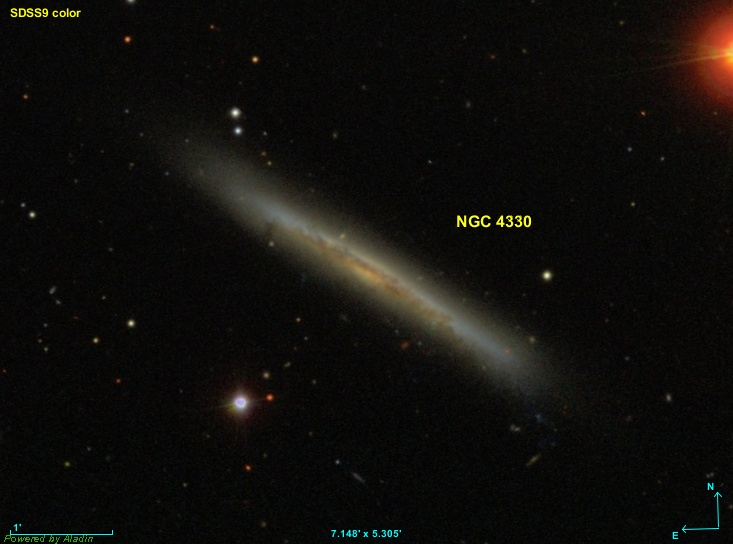
- NGC 4330 imaged by SDSS

Observation data (J2000 epoch)
- Constellation: Virgo
- Right ascension: 12^{h} 23^{m} 17.1775^{s}
- Declination: +11° 22′ 04.990″
- Redshift: 0.005214
- Heliocentric radial velocity: 1563 ± 3 km/s
- Distance: 91.3 ± 6.5 Mly (27.99 ± 1.99 Mpc)
- Group or cluster: M87 group (LGG 289)
- Apparent magnitude (V): 12.4

Characteristics
- Type: Scd?
- Size: ~105,800 ly (32.43 kpc) (estimated)
- Apparent size (V): 4.5′ × 0.9′ 4.5' x 0.9'

Other designations
- IRAS 12207+1138, 2MASX J12231724+1122047, UGC 7456, MCG +02-32-020, PGC 40201, CGCG 070-039, VCC 630

NGC 4330 is a spiral galaxy in the constellation of Virgo. Its velocity with respect to the cosmic microwave background is 1898 ± 24 km/s, which corresponds to a Hubble distance of 27.99 ± 1.99 Mpc (~112 million light-years). However, a dozen non-redshift measurements give a much closer distance of 19.642 ± 1.559 Mpc (~64.1 million light-years). The galaxy was discovered by Irish engineer Bindon Stoney on 14 April 1852.

One supernova has been observed in NGC 4330: SN 2024phz (Type II, mag. 17.669) was discovered by ATLAS on 11 July 2024.

== M87 Group and Virgo Cluster ==
According to A.M. Garcia, NGC 4330 is a member of the M87 group (also known as LGG 289). This group contains at least 96 members.

NGC 4330 is also listed as catalog number VCC 0630, a member of the Virgo Cluster.

== See also ==
- List of NGC objects (4001–5000)
