= NGC 375 =

Galaxy located in the constellation Pisces

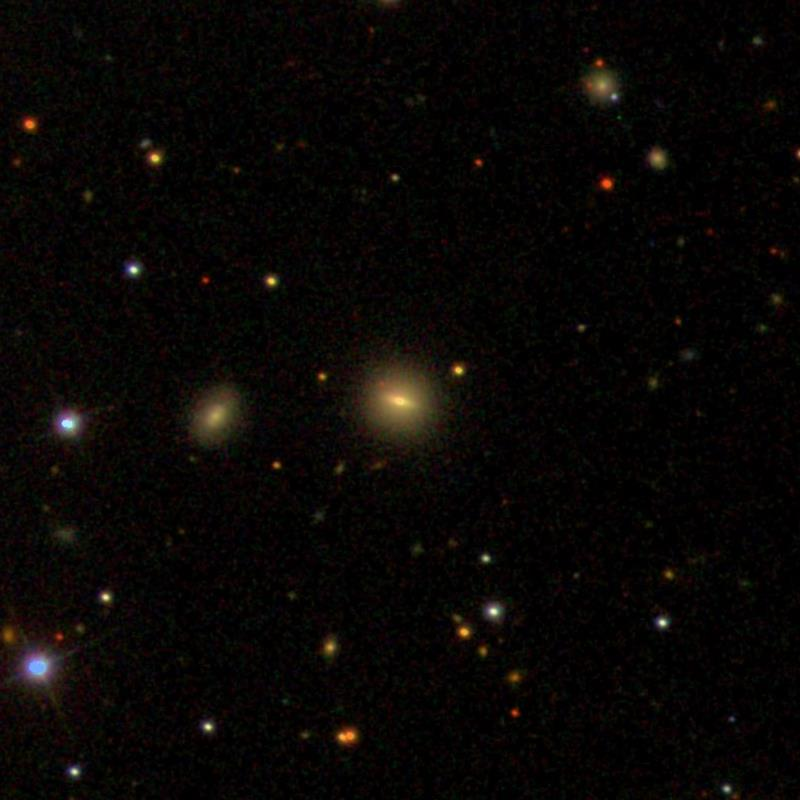
- SDSS image of NGC 375

Observation data (J2000 epoch)
- Constellation: Pisces
- Right ascension: 01^{h} 07^{m} 05.9^{s}
- Declination: +32° 20′ 53″
- Redshift: 0.019530
- Heliocentric radial velocity: 5,855 km/s
- Apparent magnitude (V): 15.73

Characteristics
- Type: E2:
- Apparent size (V): 1.4' × 1.4'

Other designations
- Arp 331, PGC 3953, 2MASX J01070592+3220534

NGC 375 is an elliptical galaxy located in the constellation Pisces. It was discovered on September 12, 1784 by William Herschel. It was described by Dreyer as "pretty faint, small, round, brighter middle." Along with galaxies NGC 379, NGC 380, NGC 382, NGC 383, NGC 384, NGC 385, NGC 386, NGC 387 and NGC 388, NGC 375 forms a galaxy cluster called Arp 331.
