= NGC 386 =

Galaxy in the constellation Pisces

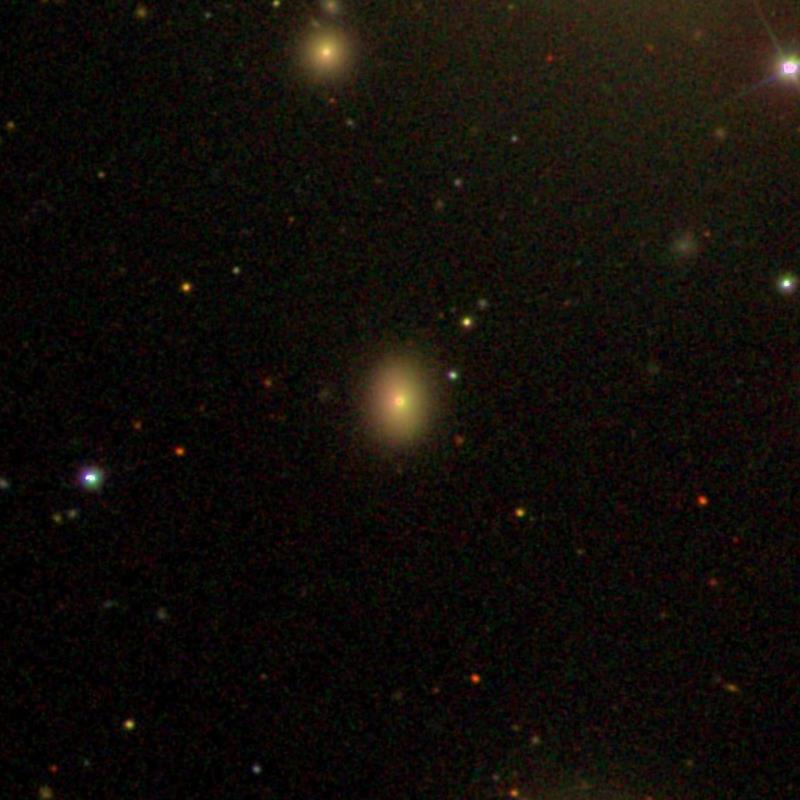
- SDSS image of NGC 386 (center)

Observation data (J2000 epoch)
- Constellation: Pisces
- Right ascension: 01^{h} 07^{m} 31.3^{s}
- Declination: +32° 21′ 43″
- Redshift: 0.018533
- Heliocentric radial velocity: 5,556 km/s
- Apparent magnitude (V): 15.33

Characteristics
- Type: E3:
- Apparent size (V): 0.9' × 0.8'

Other designations
- CGCG 501–088, MCG +05-03-057, 2MASX J01073133+3221432, 2MASXi J0107313+322143, PGC 3989.

NGC 386 is an elliptical galaxy located in the constellation Pisces. It was discovered on November 4, 1850, by Bindon Stoney. It was described by Dreyer as "considerably faint, small, round." Along with galaxies NGC 375, NGC 379, NGC 382, NGC 383, NGC 384, NGC 385, NGC 387 and NGC 388, NGC 386 forms a galaxy cluster called Arp 331.
