= NGC 1262 =

Galaxy in the constellation of Eridanus

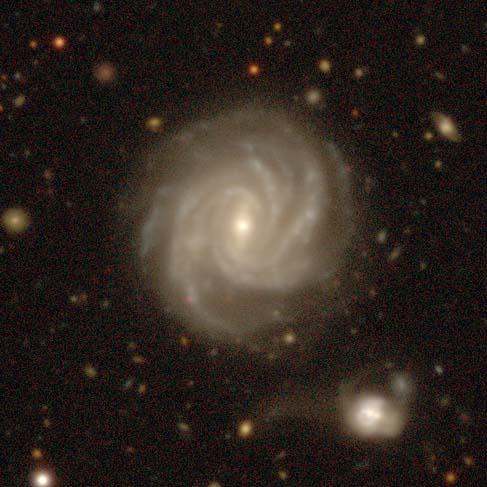
- Legacy Surveys image of NGC 1262.

Observation data (J2000 epoch)
- Constellation: Eridanus
- Right ascension: 03^{h} 15^{m} 33.6^{s}
- Declination: −15° 52′ 46″
- Redshift: 0.0506
- Heliocentric radial velocity: 15,169 km/s
- Distance: 1.503 Gly (461 Mpc)
- Apparent magnitude (V): 15.0

Characteristics
- Type: SAB(s)c
- Size: ≤410,000 ly (125.48 kpc) (estimated)
- Apparent size (V): 0.8 x 0.7

Other designations
- IRAS 03132-1604, MCG -3-9-14, PGC 12107

NGC 1262 is a barred spiral galaxy located in the constellation Eridanus. This galaxy was formerly believed to be the most distant object in the New General Catalogue with redshift and distance estimates placing it at z = 0.116 and hence roughly 507.0 megaparsecs (1,650 million light-years) from Earth, corresponding to a large isophotal diameter of about 125.59 kiloparsecs (410,000 light-years) based on its D_{25.0} apparent dimension, making it nearly five times larger than the Milky Way and one of the largest spiral galaxies. However, in 2023 using data from Ann Isaacs from the University of Minnesota, Stephen Odewahn from the McDonald Observatory used new radial velocity calculations with a new estimate of 15,169 km/s, which corresponds to a lower redshift of z = 0.0506 and hence a light-travel distance of 686 million light-years (210.3 megaparsecs), placing NGC 1262 nowhere near the most distant NGC galaxy and resulting a rather lower isophotal diameter. It was discovered by astronomer Francis Leavenworth on November 12, 1885.

Supernova AT 2014fx in NGC 1262 was discovered by citizen scientists using the Galaxy Zoo website. Its coordinates (decimal) are: ra=48.893766 dec=-15.884613.

== See also ==
- List of the most distant astronomical objects
- List of NGC objects (1001–2000)
- NGC 5609
