= Arp 166 =

Interacting pair of galaxies in the constellation Triangulum

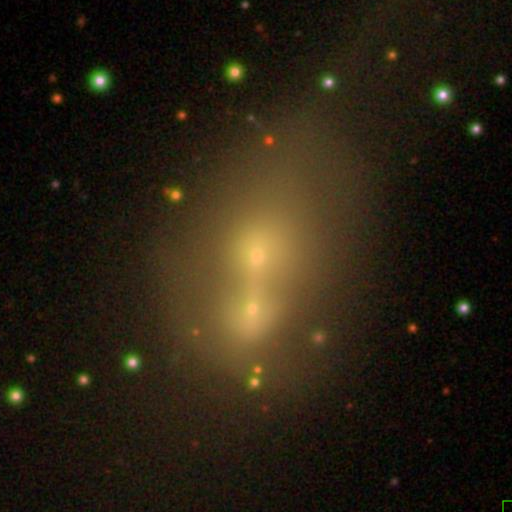
- Arp 166 consists of NGC 750 (top) and NGC 751 (bottom) (SDSS)

Observation data (J2000.0 epoch)
- Constellation: Triangulum
- Right ascension: 01^{h} 57^{m} 32.00^{s}
- Declination: +33° 12′ 24.00″
- Redshift: 0.017529
- Heliocentric radial velocity: 5255 km/s
- Distance: 225 Mly
- Apparent magnitude (B): 12.90

Characteristics
- Type: Pair of galaxies E0+E
- Apparent size (V): 2.5 x 1.7

Other designations
- NGC 750, NGC 751

Arp 166 is a pair of interacting elliptical galaxies approximately 225 million light-years away from Earth in the constellation of Triangulum. The two galaxies, NGC 750 and NGC 751, are listed together as Arp 166 in the Atlas of Peculiar Galaxies (in the category Galaxies with diffuse filaments).

== Observational history ==
Arp 166 was discovered by German-born British astronomer William Herschel on September 12, 1784, but he did not resolve this close pair of galaxies, therefore he described it as a single object NGC 750.

Arp 166 was first seen as a double by Irish engineer and astronomer Bindon Stoney on October 11, 1850, who used Lord Rosse's 72" telescope. The second galaxy from this pair, which is smaller and fainter than NGC 750, was catalogued as NGC 751.

== Interacting galaxies ==
At least 100,000,000 years have passed since the moment of the first strong tidal perturbation between these two galaxies. Both galaxies are characterized by strong tidal interactions and distortions, and they are still in the process of efficient tidal interaction.

The distance between the centers of this pair is 21", or 10 kpc in projection. Both galaxies have almost identical central radial velocities. While NGC 750 exhibits nearly flat radial velocity curves, the radial velocity curves of NGC 751 are characterized by large variations of more than 100 km s^{−1} along the slit.

A large, diffuse tidal tail extends 20 arcsec (10 kpc) to the north-east of the pair.
