= NGC 387 =

Galaxy in the constellation Pisces

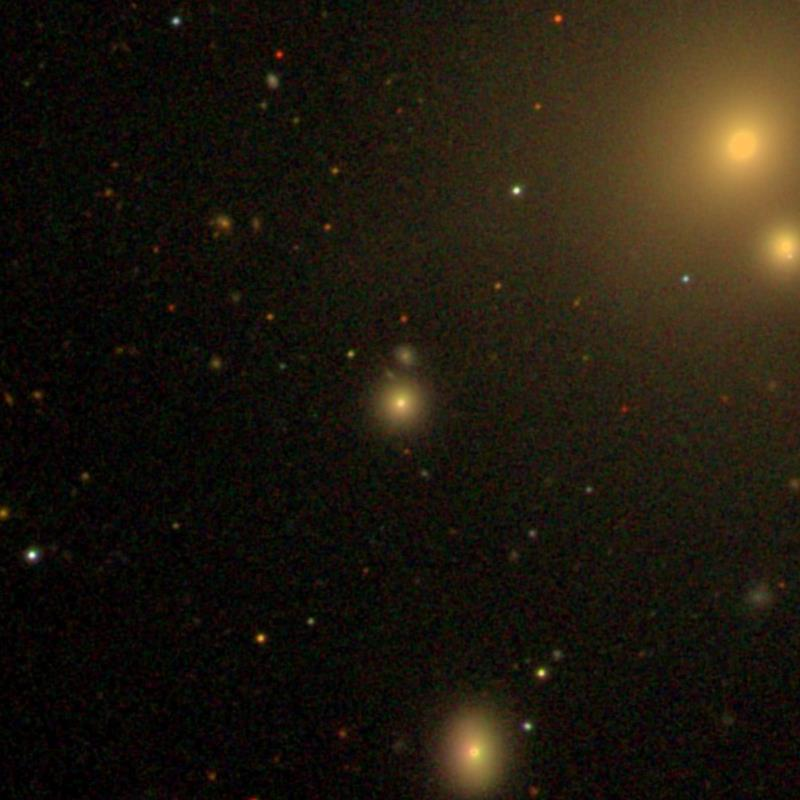
- SDSS image of NGC 387

Observation data (J2000 epoch)
- Constellation: Pisces
- Right ascension: 01^{h} 07^{m} 33.0^{s}
- Declination: +32° 23′ 28″
- Redshift: 0.015701
- Heliocentric radial velocity: 4,707 km/s
- Apparent magnitude (V): 17.2

Characteristics
- Type: E

Other designations
- 2MASX J01073307+3223282, 2MASXi J0107330+322327, PGC 3987.

NGC 387 is an elliptical galaxy located in the constellation Pisces. It was discovered on December 10, 1873 by Lawrence Parsons. It was described by Dreyer as "very faint, small, round." Along with galaxies NGC 375, NGC 379, NGC 382, NGC 383, NGC 384, NGC 385, NGC 386 and NGC 388, NGC 387 forms a galaxy cluster called Arp 331.
