= Rocky (nickname) =

Rocky is a nickname of the following people:

- Rocky Agusta (1950–2018), Italian race car driver
- Rocky Anderson (born 1951), former mayor of Salt Lake City, Utah
- Hiroaki Aoki (1938–2008), Japanese-born American restaurateur
- Rocky Belk (1960–2010), American football player
- Rocky Bleier (born 1946), American former National Football League player
- Rocky Bridges (1927–2015), Major League Baseball player and minor league manager
- Rocky Carroll (born 1963), American actor
- Rocky Castellani (1926–2008), American boxer
- Rochelle Clark (born 1981), English rugby union footballer
- Rocky Colavito (1933–2024), American Major League Baseball player
- Veronica Cooper (1913–2000), American actress
- Roy L. Dennis (1961–1978), American boy afflicted with an extremely rare bone disorder whose life was portrayed in the film Mask
- Rocky Fielding (born 1987), British boxer
- Robert Ford Jr. (1949–2020), American journalist and record producer
- Ford Garrison (1915–2001), Major League Baseball player and coach
- Rocky George (born 1965), former guitarist with the band Suicidal Tendencies
- Rocky Gray (born 1974), drummer of the band Evanescence
- Rocky Graziano (1919–1990), American boxer
- Bob Johnson (infielder) (1936–2019), former Major League Baseball player
- Rocky Johnson (1944–2020), Canadian professional wrestler
- Rocky Juarez (born 1980), Mexican-American boxer
- Rocky Lamar, American retired college basketball coach
- Allan Lane (1909–1973), American actor
- Rocky Lockridge (1959–2019), American former boxer
- Rocky Long (born 1950), American college football coach and former player
- Rocky MacDougall (1943–2009), Canadian former boxer
- Rocky Marciano (1923–1969), American world heavyweight boxing champion
- Rocky Mattioli (born 1953), Italian-born Australian former boxer
- Rocky Nelson (1924–2006), Major League Baseball player
- Rocky Raczkowski (born 1968), American politician
- Bobby Rhawn (1919–1984), Major League Baseball player
- David Rocastle (1967–2001), English footballer
- Mike Rockenfeller (born 1983), German race car driver
- Nelson Rockefeller (1908–1979), American businessman, philanthropist, public servant and politician, former Vice President of the United States and Governor of New York
- Graciano Rocchigiani (1963–2018), German boxer
- Rocky Rodríguez (born 1993), Costa Rican footballer
- Rocky Ryan (1937–2004), British media hoaxer
- Rocky Sekorski (born 1957), American heavyweight boxer
- Rocky Thompson (golfer) (1939–2021), American golfer
- Rocky Wirtz (1952-2023), principal owner and chairman of the National Hockey League's Chicago Blackhawks
- Saimoni Rokini (born 1972), Fijian rugby union footballer
- John Stone (baseball) (1905–1955), Major League Baseball player
- Derek Turner (1932–2015), English former rugby player
- Humbert Roque Versace (1937–1965), US Army officer awarded the Medal of Honor
- Frank C. Whitmore (1887–1947), American chemist
- Rocky Wirtz (1952–2023), American businessman, principal owner and chairman of the Chicago Blackhawks

== See also ==
- Rock (name), which includes a short list of people nicknamed "Rock"
- Stoney (name), which includes people with the nickname
