= George Francis FitzGerald =

Irish theoretical physicist (1851–1901)

George FitzGerald FRS HonFRSE
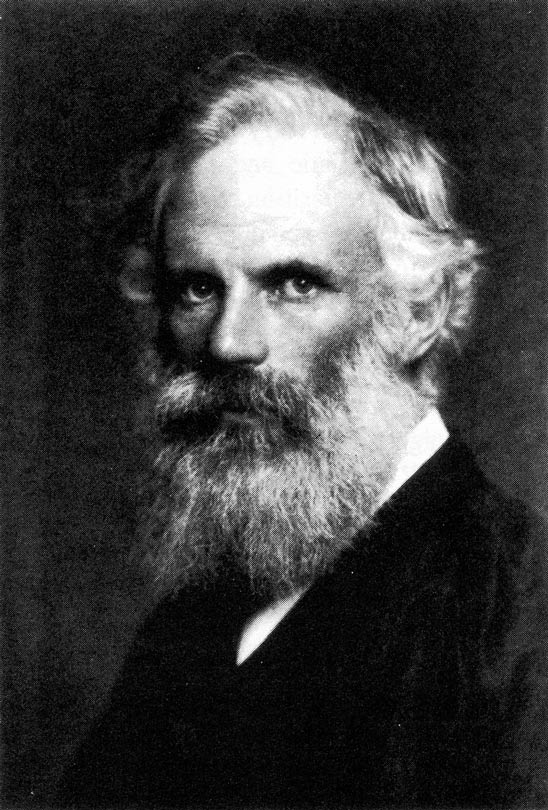
- FitzGerald, 1890s
- Born: 3 August 1851; Dublin, Ireland, UKGBI
- Died: 21 February 1901 (aged 49); Dublin, Ireland, UKGBI
- Resting place: Mount Jerome Cemetery, Dublin
- Education: Trinity College Dublin
- Known for: Lorentz–FitzGerald contraction
- Spouse: Harriette Jellett (m. 1885)
- Children: 8
- Father: William FitzGerald
- Relatives: John Hewitt Jellett (father-in-law); George Johnstone Stoney (uncle); Bindon Blood Stoney (uncle)
- Awards: MRIA (1878); FRS (1883); Royal Medal (1899); HonFRSE (1900)
- Scientific career
- Title: Erasmus Smith's Professor of Natural and Experimental Philosophy (1881–1901)
- Fields: Electromagnetism
- Workplaces: Trinity College Dublin (1877–1901)

George Francis FitzGerald (3 August 1851 – 21 February 1901) was an Irish theoretical physicist known for hypothesising length contraction, which became an integral part of Albert Einstein's special theory of relativity.

== Biography ==
George Francis FitzGerald was born on 3 August 1851 in Monkstown, Dublin, the son of The Reverend William FitzGerald and Anne Frances Stoney (sister of George Johnstone Stoney and Bindon Blood Stoney). Professor of Moral Philosophy at Trinity College Dublin and vicar of St. Ann's Church, Dawson Street, at the time of his son's birth, William FitzGerald was consecrated Bishop of Cork, Cloyne and Ross in 1857 and translated to Killaloe and Clonfert in 1862.

FitzGerald was homeschooled; his tutor was the sister of George Boole, who was Professor of Mathematics at Queen's College Cork. FitzGerald entered Trinity College Dublin at the age of 16, graduating in 1871 in Mathematics and Experimental Science. He became a Fellow of Trinity College in 1877, and was appointed Erasmus Smith's Professor of Natural and Experimental Philosophy in 1881.

Along with Oliver Lodge, Oliver Heaviside and Heinrich Hertz, FitzGerald was a leading figure among the group of "Maxwellians" who revised, extended, clarified, and confirmed James Clerk Maxwell's mathematical theories of the electromagnetic field during the late 1870s and the 1880s. In 1883, following from Maxwell's equations, FitzGerald was the first to suggest a device for producing rapidly oscillating electric currents to generate electromagnetic waves, a phenomenon which was first shown to exist experimentally by Hertz in 1886.

FitzGerald suffered from many digestive problems for much of his shortened life; he became very ill with stomach problems. He died on 21 February 1901 at his home in Dublin at the age of 49, shortly after an operation on a perforated ulcer. He is buried at Mount Jerome cemetery.

== Length contraction ==
FitzGerald is better known for his conjecture in his short letter to the editor of Science that if all moving objects were foreshortened in the direction of their motion, it would account for the curious null-results of the Michelson–Morley experiment. FitzGerald based this idea in part on the way electromagnetic forces were known to be affected by motion. In particular, he used some equations that had been derived a short time before by his friend, Oliver Heaviside. The Dutch physicist Hendrik Lorentz hit on a very similar idea in 1892 and developed it more fully into Lorentz transformations, in connection with his theory of electrons.

The Lorentz–FitzGerald contraction hypothesis became an essential part of the special theory of relativity, as Albert Einstein published it in 1905. Einstein demonstrated the kinematic nature of this effect, by deriving it from the principle of relativity and the constancy of the speed of light.

== Flying experiments ==
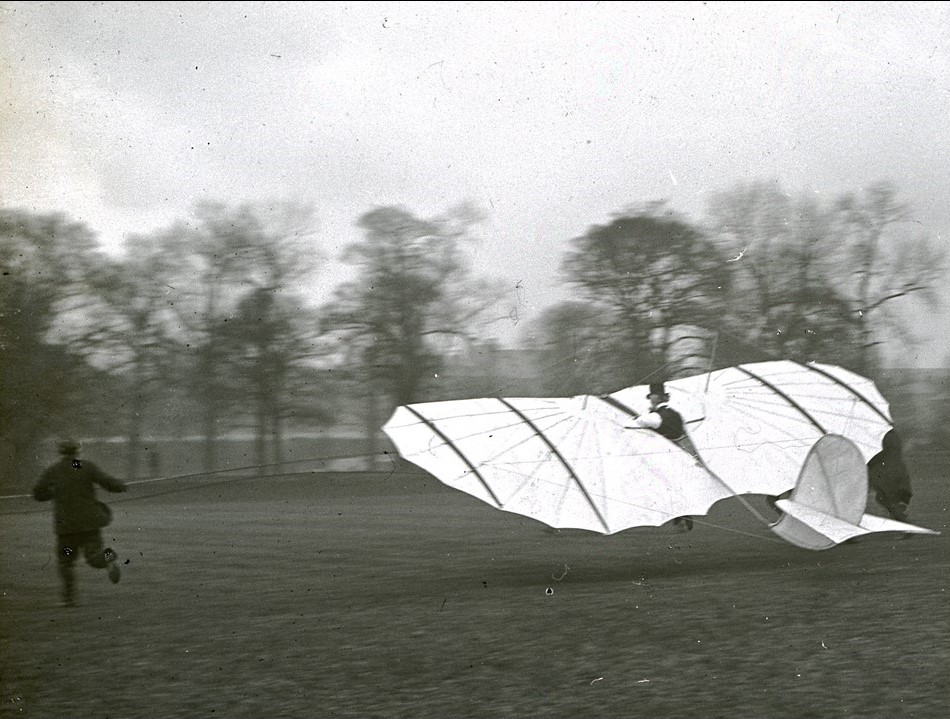
George Francis Fitzgerald flying in College Park in 1895

FitzGerald, in common with others at the end of the nineteenth century, became obsessed with the desire to fly. His attempts in College Park, in Trinity College Dublin, in 1895 involved large numbers of students pulling tow-ropes attached to the Lilienthal glider, and attracted the attention of the people of Dublin, beyond the Nassau Street railings. FitzGerald took off his coat on these occasions, but retained his top hat, which was normal headgear for a Fellow at that time. The experiments were not crowned with success, and were eventually abandoned. The flying machine hung for many years in the Museum Building until an idle engineering student applied a match to the cord from which it was hanging. The flame travelled along the cord and consumed the glider before the helpless onlookers.

== Family ==
On 21 December 1885, FitzGerald married Harriette Mary Jellett, the daughter of The Reverend John Hewitt Jellett, Provost of TCD, and Dorothea Morris Morgan. He had eight children with her; three sons and five daughters.

FitzGerald was the nephew of George Johnstone Stoney, the Irish physicist who coined the term electron. After the particle was discovered by J. J. Thomson in 1897, FitzGerald was the one to propose calling it the electron. FitzGerald was also the nephew of Bindon Blood Stoney, an eminent Irish engineer. His cousin was Edith Anne Stoney, a pioneer female medical physicist.

== Awards and honours ==
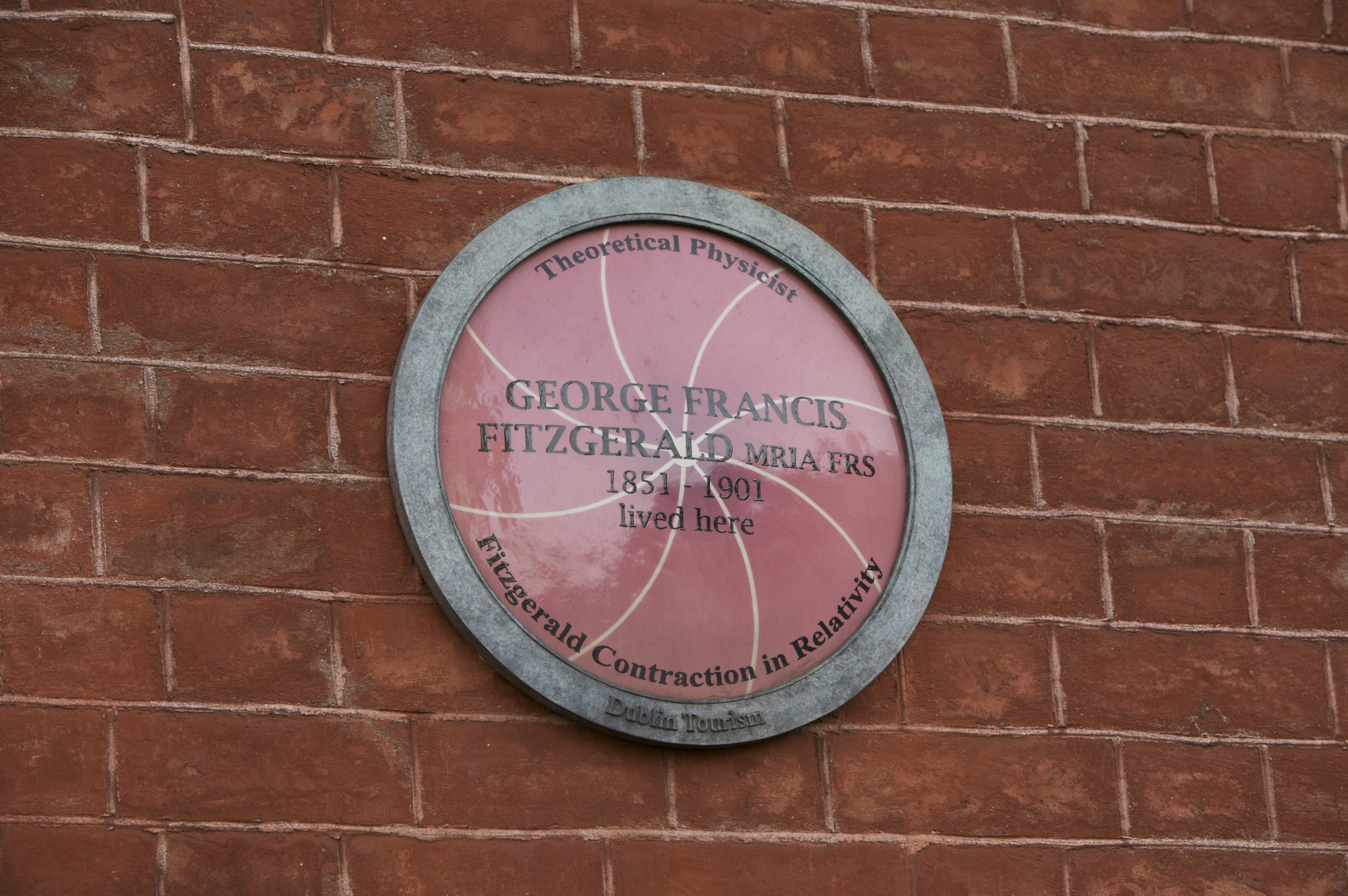
Plaque at 7 Ely Place, Dublin, where FitzGerald lived

In 1878, FitzGerald was elected a Member of the Royal Irish Academy (MRIA). From 1881 to 1889, he was Secretary of the Royal Dublin Society. In 1883, he was elected Fellow of the Royal Society (FRS). In 1899, he was awarded the Royal Medal "for his contributions to physical science, especially in the domains of optics and electricity". The following year, he was made an Honorary Fellow of the Royal Society of Edinburgh (HonFRSE).

FitzGerald crater on the far side of the Moon is named in his honour, as well as the Fitzgerald Building at Trinity College Dublin.

== Bibliography ==
- Jarret, Philip. "Soaring Inspiration: Otto Lilienthal's Influence in Britain". Air Enthusiast, No. 65, September–October 1996, pp. 2–7. ISSN 0143-5450.
