= NGC 751 =

Galaxy in the constellation Triangulum

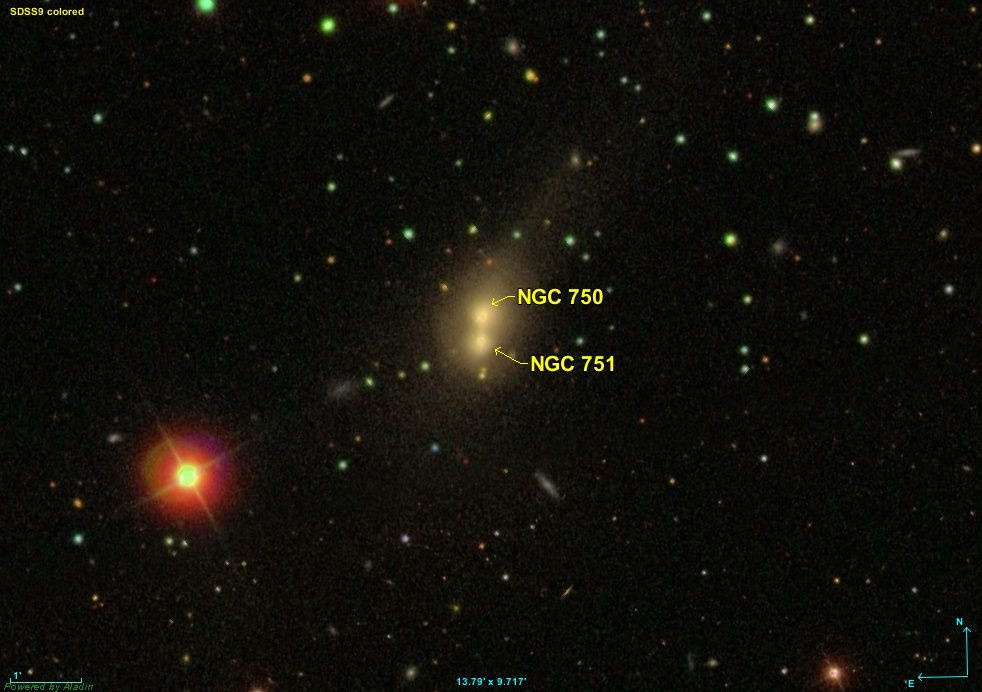
- Interacting galaxies NGC 750 (top) and NGC 751 (bottom) (SDSS)

Observation data (J2000.0 epoch)
- Constellation: Triangulum
- Right ascension: 01^{h} 57^{m} 33.00^{s}
- Declination: +33° 12′ 11.00″
- Redshift: 0.017185
- Heliocentric radial velocity: 5152 ± 8 km/s
- Distance: 225 Mly
- Apparent magnitude (V): 12.20
- Apparent magnitude (B): 13.20

Characteristics
- Type: E pec
- Apparent size (V): 1.2 x 1.2

Other designations
- PGC 7370, MCG +05-05-035, UGC 1431, Arp 166

NGC 751 is an elliptical galaxy approximately 225 million light-years away from Earth in the constellation of Triangulum. It forms a close pair of interacting galaxies together with the nearby NGC 750 galaxy. The pair is listed as Arp 166 in the Atlas of Peculiar Galaxies (in the category Galaxies with diffuse filaments).

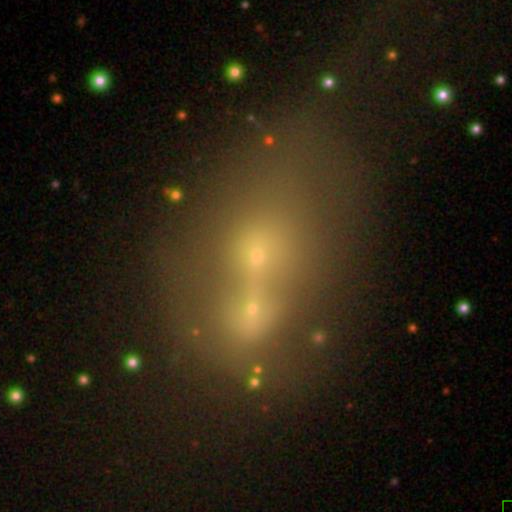
Close pair of interacting galaxies NGC 750 (top) and NGC 751 (bottom) (SDSS)

== Observational history ==
NGC 751 was discovered 66 years after the discovery of NGC 750. German-born British astronomer William Herschel was first to discover a galaxy at this location on September 12, 1784, but he did not resolve this close pair, therefore he described it as a single object NGC 750.

NGC 751, which is smaller and fainter than NGC 750, was first resolved by Irish engineer and astronomer Bindon Stoney on October 11, 1850, who used Lord Rosse's 72" telescope.

== Interaction with NGC 750 ==
At least 100,000,000 years have passed since the moment of the first strong tidal perturbation between these two galaxies. Both galaxies are characterized by strong tidal interactions and distortions, and they are still in the process of efficient tidal interaction.

The distance between the centers of this pair is 21", or 10 kpc in projection. Both galaxies have almost identical central radial velocities. While NGC 750 exhibits nearly flat radial velocity curves, the radial velocity curves of NGC 751 are characterized by large variations of more than 100 km s^{−1} along the slit.

A large, diffuse tidal tail extends 20 arcsec (10 kpc) to the north-east of the pair.

== See also ==
- List of NGC objects (1–1000)
