= Edith Anne Stoney =

Anglo-Irish medical physicist

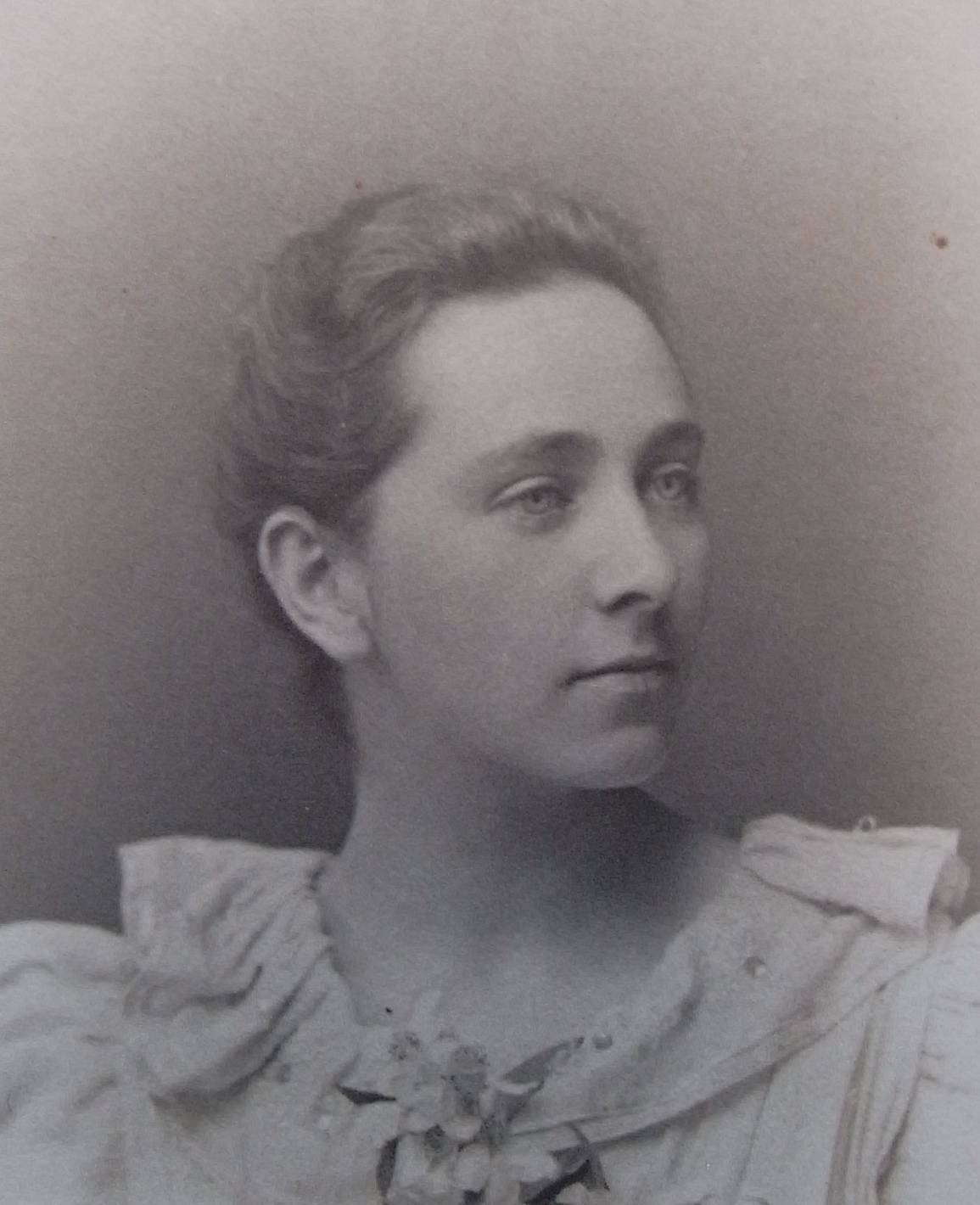
- Edith Anne Stoney c. early 1890s
- Born: 6 January 1869; Dublin, Ireland
- Died: 25 June 1938 (aged 69); Bournemouth, England
- Education: Newnham College, Cambridge; Trinity College, Dublin
- Scientific career
- Fields: Medical Physics
- Workplaces: London School of Medicine for Women; King's College for Women

Edith Anne Stoney (6 January 1869 – 25 June 1938) was an Irish physicist. Born in Dublin in an old-established Anglo-Irish scientific family, she is considered to be the first woman medical physicist.

== Early life and family ==
Edith Stoney was born at 40 Wellington Road, Ballsbridge, Dublin; the daughter of George Johnstone Stoney, FRS, an eminent physicist who coined the term electron in 1891 as the 'fundamental unit quantity of electricity', and his wife and cousin, Margaret Sophia Stoney. One of her two brothers, George Gerald, was an engineer and a Fellow of the Royal Society (FRS). One of her two sisters, Florence Stoney, was a radiologist and received an OBE. Her cousin was the Dublin-based physicist George Francis FitzGerald FRS (1851–1901), and her uncle Bindon Blood Stoney FRS was Engineer of Dublin Port, renowned for building a number of the main Dublin bridges, and developing the Quayside.

Edith Stoney demonstrated considerable mathematical talent and gained a scholarship at Newnham College, Cambridge, where she achieved a First in the Part I Tripos examination in 1893. However, she was not awarded a University of Cambridge degree as women were excluded from graduation until 1948. During her time at Newnham, she was in charge of the College telescope. She was later awarded a BA and an MA from Trinity College Dublin, after this instititution accepted women in 1904.

After briefly working on gas turbine calculations and searchlight design for Sir Charles Algernon Parsons, she took a mathematics teaching post at the Cheltenham Ladies’ College.

== London (Royal Free) School of Medicine for Women ==
Following the 1876 Medical Act, it was illegal for academic institutions to prevent access to medical education based on the sex of the applicant. The first medical school for women in Britain was established in 1874 by Dr Sophia Jex-Blake in anticipation of this law. The London School of Medicine for Women quickly became part of the University of London, with clinical teaching at the Royal Free Hospital. Edith's sister Florence was a student at the school, she graduated in medicine with honours in 1895 (MB BS) and obtained her MD in 1898. Meanwhile, Edith gained an appointment as a physics lecturer at the school in 1899. Her first tasks were to set up a physics laboratory and design the physics course. The laboratory was planned for 20 students, and the course content was pure physics, as required by university regulations; it included mechanics, magnetism, electricity, optics, sound, heat and energy. In her obituary in The Lancet, an ex-student of hers noted: "Her lectures on physics mostly developed into informal talks, during which Miss Stoney, usually in a blue pinafore, scratched on a blackboard with coloured chalks, turning anxiously at intervals to ask 'Have you taken my point?'. She was perhaps too good a mathematician … to understand the difficulties of the average medical student, but experience had taught her how distressing these could be".

In 1901, the Royal Free Hospital appointed Florence into a new part-time position of medical electrician. The following April, the two sisters opened a new x-ray service in the electrical department.

During their time at the Royal Free Hospital, the two sisters actively supported the women's suffrage movement, though opposed the direct violent action with which it was later associated.

During her time at the school, she also played a central role in the British Federation of University Women (BFUW). She was elected treasurer, in her absence, at the first executive meeting on 9 October 1909, a position that she held until the end of May 1915. She became increasingly engaged with the political lobbying of the Federation. At the executive meeting on 19 October 1912, she proposed the names of two members for a subcommittee to secure the passing into law of a bill to enable women to become barristers, solicitors or parliamentary agents. The legislation was eventually enacted after the war within the Sex Disqualification (Removal) Act 1919.

Edith Stoney resigned her post at the school in March 1915, and it was recorded that 'with due regret and most unwillingly a change is desirable in the physics lectureship'. Edith Stoney was offered £300 upon tendering her resignation.

== World War I ==
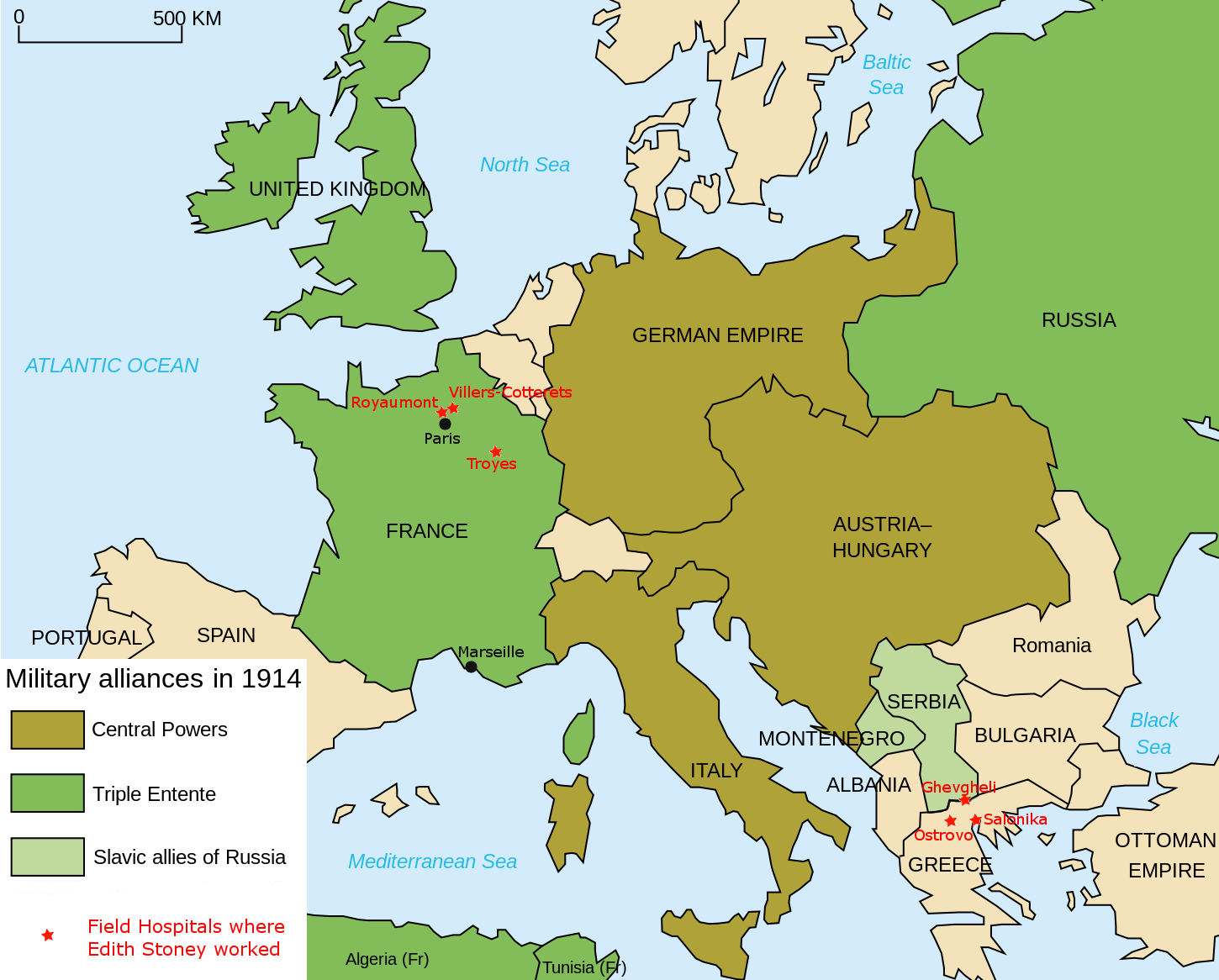
Map locating the different Field Hospitals where Edith Anne Stoney worked during WWI. Map represent borders in 1914

Both Florence and Edith offered their services to the British Red Cross at the War Office in London, to provide a radiological service to support the troops in Europe, on the day Britain declared war. Their offer was refused, because they were women. Florence set up her own unit with the Women's Imperial Service League and spent the next 6 months in Europe. Edith organised supplies from London where she also served on the League's committee. Florence returned to London at the time Edith resigned from the London School of Medicine for Women. Edith contacted the Scottish Women's Hospitals (SWH), an organisation formed in 1914 to give medical support in the field of battle and financed by the women's suffrage movement. The organisation had gained agreement to set up a new 250-bed tented hospital at Domaine de Chanteloup, Sainte-Savine, near Troyes (France), funded by the Cambridge women's colleges of Girton and Newnham and it became Edith's role to plan and operate the x-ray facilities. She established stereoscopy to localise bullets and shrapnel and introduced the use of x-rays in the diagnosis of gas gangrene, interstitial gas being a mandate for immediate amputation to give any chance of survival.

The hospital was near the front line and, in her own words, by September 1915, ‘the town had been evacuated, the station had been mined, and we heard the heavy guns ever going at night time’. The unit was entirely female, except for two part-time male drivers, and her technical assistant, Mr Mallett.

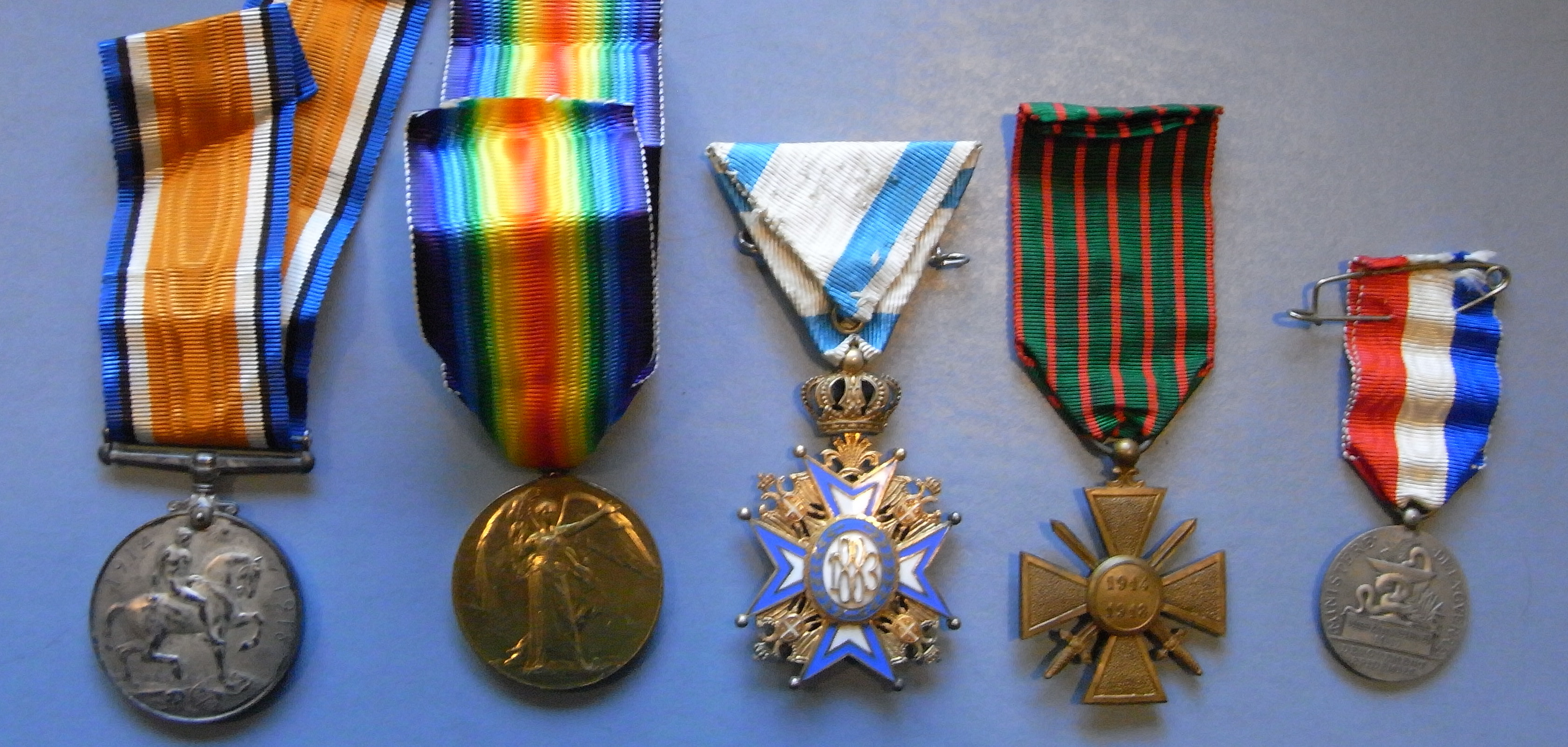
Edith Stoney's medals held at Newnham College, Cambridge. From left to right: British War Medal (reverse), Victory Medal (obverse), Serbian Order of St Sava (reverse), French Croix de Guerre (reverse) and French “Médaille des épidémies" (reverse).

They were assigned to the Corps Expéditionnaire d’Orient and order to move to Serbia. After boarding the steamship Mossoul in Marseille, they reached Salonika (known as Thessaloniki in modern Greece) on 3 November, where they took the night train north to Ghevgheli (now Gevgelija in modern North Macedonia), on the Serbian side of the Greek border. They set up a hospital in an unused silk factory where they treated 100 patients with injuries ranging from frostbite to severe lung and head wounds. Following defeats at the hands of Bulgarian forces, Edith and her staff retreated to Salonika by 6 December 1916. Eleven days later, they had re-established the hospital on a drained low swamp by the sea, and by New Year's Day 1917 Edith had the lights on and the x-rays working. Despite the lack of equipment and resources, she established an electrotherapy department and various equipments for the muscular rehabilitation of the soldiers in their care. She also assisted with problems on two British hospital ships, on which the x-ray systems had been damaged during a storm, and gave support to the SWH unit in Ostrovo (now Arnissa on Lake Vegoritida formerly lake Ostrovo in Northern Greece), which arrived during September 1916. She had a break for sick leave in December 1917 and returned until the following summer. She applied for an appointment as an army camp radiologist in Salonika, but her demand was blocked by the War Office.

In October 1917, she returned to France to lead the x-ray departments at the SWH hospitals of Royaumont and Villers-Cotterêts. In March 1918, she had to supervise a camp closure and retreat for the third time, when Villers-Cotterêts was overrun by the German troops. During the final months of the war the fighting intensified and there was a steep increase in workload; in the month of June alone the x-ray workload peaked at over 1,300, partly because of an increased use of fluoroscopy.

Her war service was recognised by several countries, and she was awarded the “Médaille des épidémies du ministère de la Guerre” and the Croix de Guerre from France, the Order of St Sava from Serbia, and the Victory and British War Medals from Britain.

== Post-war and retirement ==
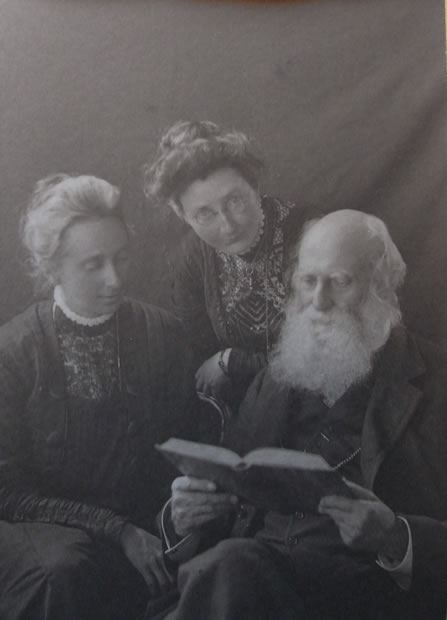
From left to right: Edith Stoney (left), with her sister Florence and father Johnstone

On returning to England, Edith Stoney took a post as lecturer in physics in the Household and Social Science department at King's College for Women which she held until retirement in 1925. After leaving King's she moved to Bournemouth, where she lived with her sister Florence, who was suffering from spinal cancer (and died in 1932).
During her retirement, she resumed her work with the BFUW for which she had acted as the first treasurer before the war. She became one of the earliest (and oldest) members of the Women's Engineering Society and played an active part in the organisation until shortly before her death. She travelled widely and, in 1934, she spoke to the Australian Federation of University Women on the subject of women in engineering, highlighting the contribution made by women workers during the war. In 1936, she established the Johnstone and Florence Stoney Studentship in the BFUW, for ‘research in biological, geological, meteorological or radiological science undertaken preferably in Australia, New Zealand or South Africa’. The studentship is now administered by Newnham College, Cambridge, and supports clinical medical students going abroad for their elective period. The declaration of Trust was dated 11 February 1942 and the Johnstone And Florence Stoney Studentship Fund Charity (no. 273043) was registered on 25 Mar 1976.
Edith Stoney died on 25 June 1938, at age 69, and obituaries were printed in both the scientific and medical press - Nature, The Lancet The Woman Engineer and national newspapers in England, The Times and Australia.

== Legacy ==
Stoney's work during the war included developing radiological methods under challenging field conditions. She supported opportunities for women in higher education by helping graduate women undertake research abroad and by establishing a fund that allowed physicists to enter medical training. Through her professional contributions, she played an early role in the development of medical physics.

== See also ==
- Timeline of women in science

== Bibliography ==
- Duck, Francis A. (2015). Physicists and Physicians: A History of Medical Physics from the Renaissance to Röntgen. Institute of Physics and Engineering in Medicine. ISBN 978-1-903613-55-9.
