= NGC 5461 =

Nebula in the constellation Ursa Major

Nebula
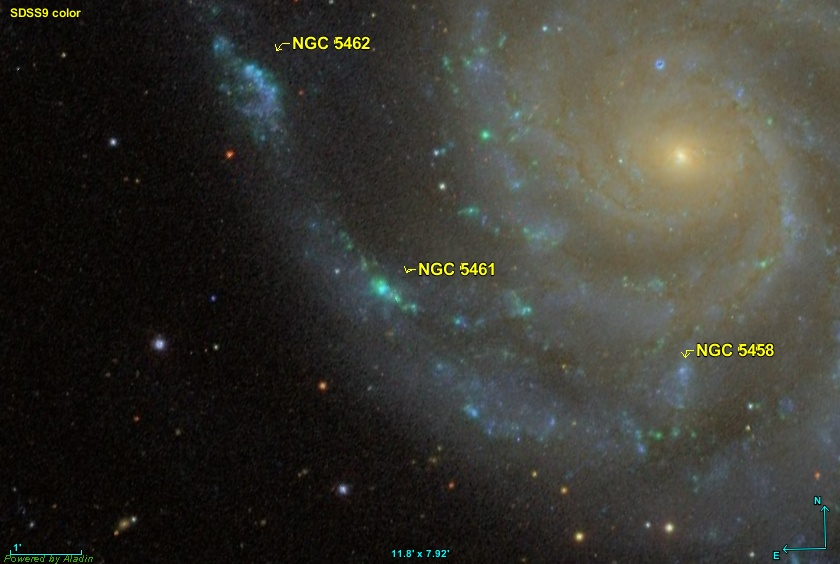

Observation data: J2000 epoch
- Right ascension: 14h 03m 41s
- Declination: +54° 19’ 04”
- Apparent magnitude (V): 14.38

NGC 5461 is an emission nebula (HII region) located in Messier 101 (the Pinwheel Galaxy) towards the constellation Ursa Major. Eight other regions of Messier 101 are listed in the New General Catalogue, namely NGC 5447, NGC 5449, NGC 5450, NGC 5451, NGC 5453, NGC 5458, NGC 5461 and NGC 5462. Three of these regions were discovered by William Herschel (NGC 5447, NGC 5461 and NGC 5462) and the other six by Bindon Stoney.

== See also ==
- List of NGC objects (5001–6000)
- Lists of nebulae
