= Fibroid =

Fibroid most commonly refers to a uterine fibroid, but may also refer to:

- Leiomyoma, a benign smooth muscle tumor (often found in the uterus)
  - Uterine fibroid, a leiomyoma in the uterus
- Fibroma, a tumor of fibrous connective tissue usually found on the skin
- Inflammatory fibroid polyp, in the colon
