= NGC 2708 =

Galaxy in the constellation Hydra

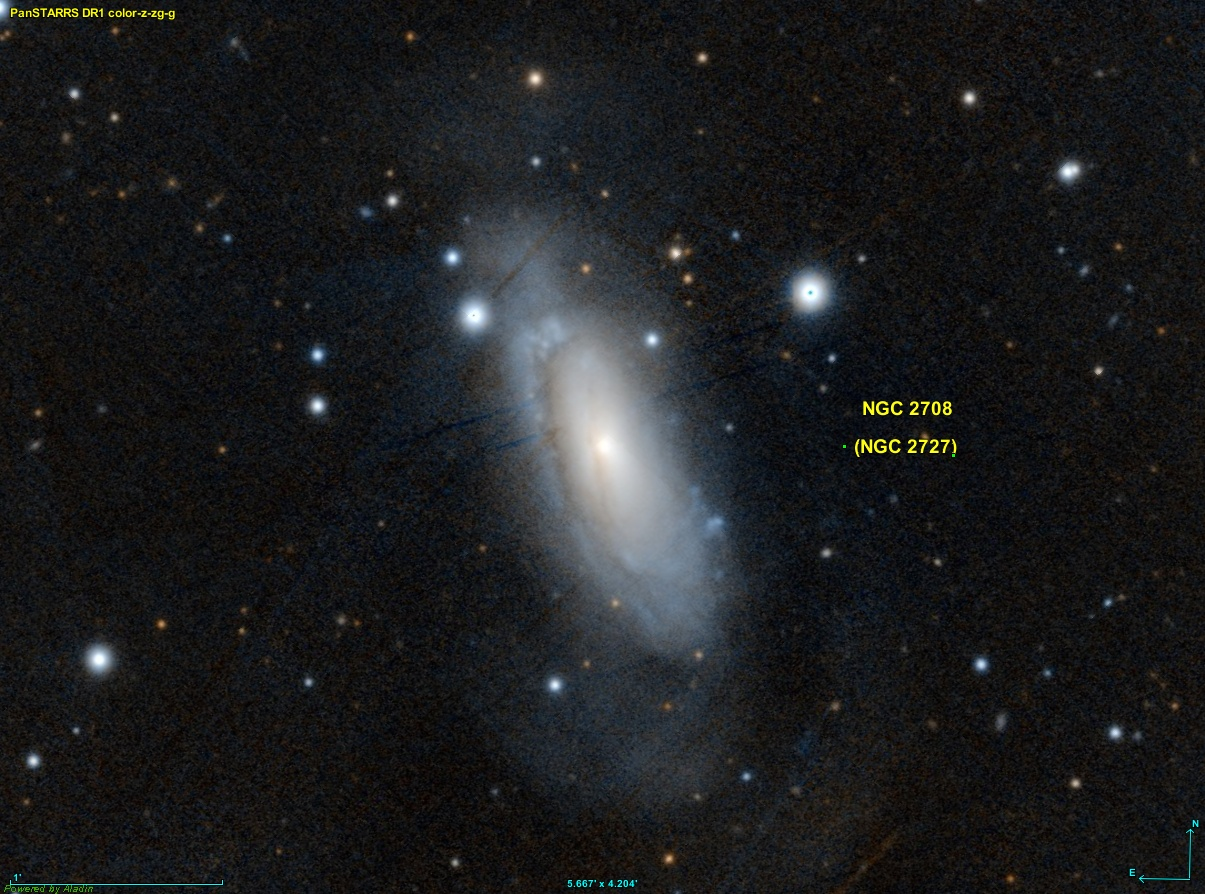
- NGC 2708 imaged by Pan-STARRS

Observation data (J2000 epoch)
- Constellation: Hydra
- Right ascension: 08^{h} 56^{m} 08.0688^{s}
- Declination: −03° 21′ 36.467″
- Redshift: 0.006698
- Heliocentric radial velocity: 2008 ± 5 km/s
- Distance: 111.4 ± 7.9 Mly (34.15 ± 2.41 Mpc)
- Group or cluster: NGC 2708 Group (LGG 164)
- Apparent magnitude (V): 12.0

Characteristics
- Type: SAB(s)b pec?
- Size: ~98,800 ly (30.29 kpc) (estimated)
- Apparent size (V): 2.7′ × 1.4′

Other designations
- IRAS 08535-0309, 2MASX J08560804-0321363, NGC 2727, MCG +00-23-015, PGC 25097, CGCG 005-034

NGC 2708 is a spiral galaxy in the constellation of Hydra. Its velocity with respect to the cosmic microwave background is 2315 ± 22 km/s, which corresponds to a Hubble distance of 34.15 ± 2.41 Mpc (~111 million light-years). It was discovered by German-British astronomer William Herschel on 6 January 1785. This galaxy was also observed by British astronomer John Herschel on 12 March 1826, and later listed as NGC 2727.

The SIMBAD database lists NGC 2708 as a Seyfert II galaxy, i.e. a galaxy with a quasar-like nucleus with very high surface brightnesses whose spectra reveal strong, high-ionisation emission lines, but unlike quasars, the host galaxy is clearly detectable.

== NGC 2708 Group ==
According to A.M. Garcia, NGC 2708 is the namesake of the four member NGC 2708 group (also known as LGG 164). The other three galaxies are: NGC 2695, NGC 2699, and NGC 2706.

== Supernova ==
One supernova has been observed in NGC 2708: SN 2023bee (Type Ia, mag. 17.2621) was discovered by the Distance Less Than 40 Mpc Survey (DLT40) on 1 February 2023.

== See also ==
- List of NGC objects (2001–3000)
