= NGC 777 =

Galaxy in the constellation Triangulum

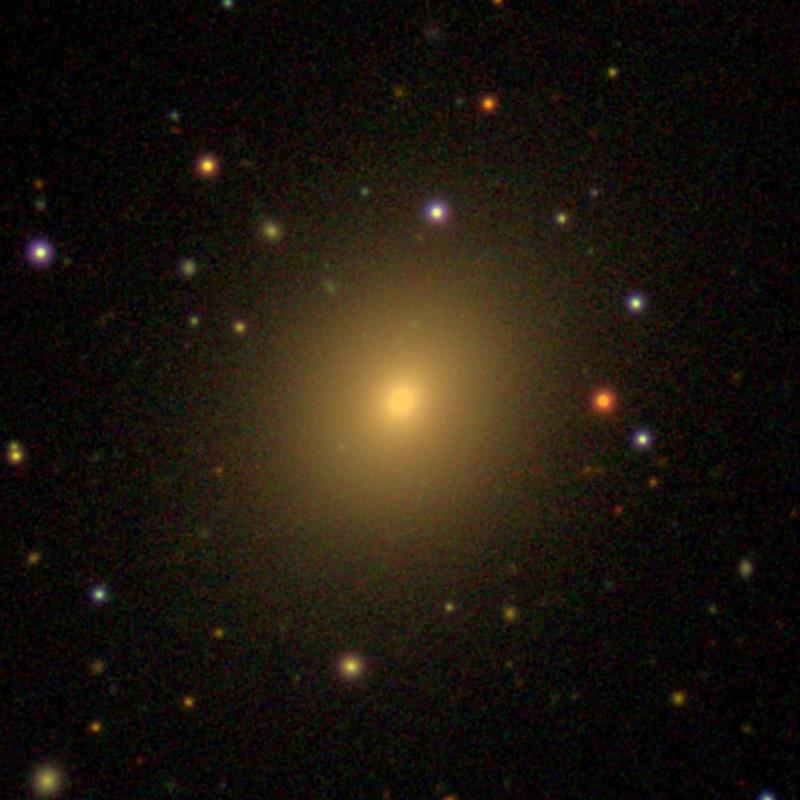
- NGC 777

Observation data (J2000 epoch)
- Constellation: Triangulum
- Right ascension: 2^{h} 00^{m} 14.907^{s}
- Declination: 31° 25′ 46″
- Redshift: 0.016708
- Heliocentric radial velocity: 5,015 km/s
- Distance: 189 million ly (58.075 mpc)
- Apparent magnitude (V): 12

Characteristics
- Type: E1
- Apparent size (V): 2.5' x 2.0'

Other designations
- CGCG 503-67, MCG 5-5-38, PGC 7584, UGC 1476

NGC 777 is an elliptical galaxy in the constellation of Triangulum. It was discovered by William Herschel on September 12, 1784. It has a weak active nucleus of type Seyfert 2 or LINER 2, implying that the central region is obscured. When observed in radio waves the galaxy has a bright nucleus from which emerge small two radio jets about 18 kpc across. The jets are of Fanaroff–Riley class I. It may be an outlying member of galaxy cluster Abell 262.
