= Florence Stoney =

Irish radiologist

Florence Ada Stoney
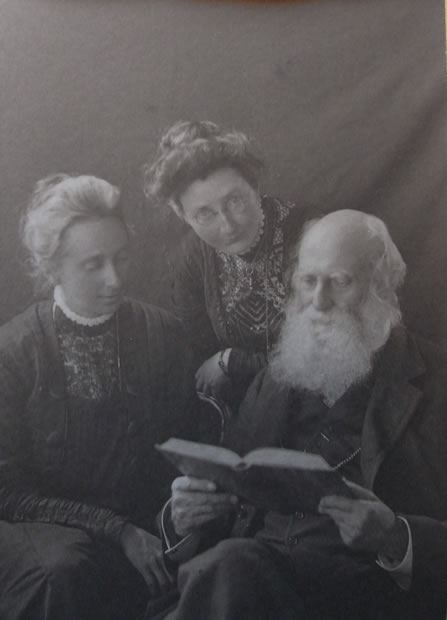
- Florence Stoney (middle), with her sister Edith and father Johnstone
- Born: 4 February 1870; Dublin, Ireland
- Died: 7 October 1932 (aged 62); Bournemouth, England
- Education: Royal College of Science for Ireland
- Scientific career
- Fields: radiologist
- Workplaces: Royal Free Hospital; New Hospital for Women

Florence Ada Stoney (4 February 1870 – 7 October 1932) was an Irish physician who was the first female radiologist in the United Kingdom. During World War I she served abroad as head of the X-ray department and of staff in makeshift hospitals.

== Early life ==
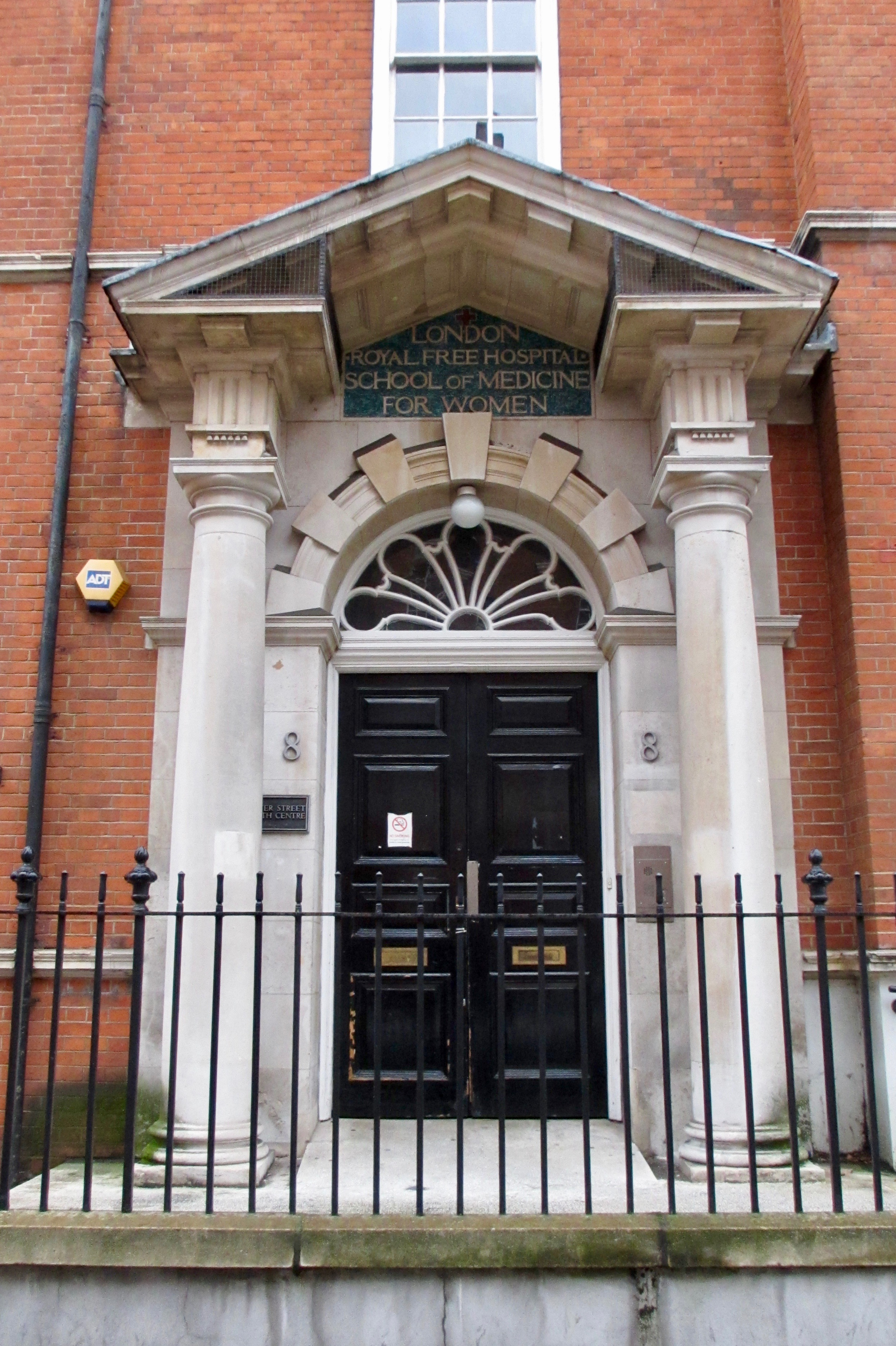
London School of Medicine for Women, where Stoney obtained her MD

Stoney was born 4 February 1870 in Dublin to George and Margaret Sophia Stoney (30 September 1843 - 13 October 1872). Her father was a mathematical physicist who would later serve as Secretary of Queens University, and was an advocate for women's right to higher education in Ireland. His efforts are considered to be among the principal reasons that women could qualify for a medical license. Florence Stoney, who was of weak health as a child, was at first privately educated in the home, but then attended the Royal College for Science of Ireland with her sister Edith.

In 1883, the Stoney family moved to London in order to provide higher education for the daughters since this was unavailable for women in Ireland at the time. Stoney attended the London School of Medicine for Women, where she was a distinguished student with great academic achievements in subjects such as anatomy and physiology. She obtained her MBBS with honours in 1895 and a Doctor of Medicine in 1898, going on to specialise in radiology.

== Career and role in World War I ==
Stoney worked as an ENT clinical assistant at the Royal Free Hospital, as well as spending six years as a demonstrator in anatomy at the London School of Medicine for Women.

After this, she spent a short amount of time in the Victoria Children's Hospital in Hull and then went on to establish an X-ray department in the Elizabeth Garret Anderson Hospital for Women in London in 1902. At the hospital, she carried out a variety of work but mainly dealt with X-rays, often developing the radiographic plates at her own house. She was the first female radiologist to work in the United Kingdom at a time when knowledge on radiology and the equipment involved was still in its developmental stages. She was forced to work in poor conditions with badly ventilated rooms and a lack of space for X-ray work. Stoney was given no assistance and had to do the majority of the work on her own. Furthermore, she was excluded as a member of the medical staff and from the X-ray department committee. In 1906, she set up a practice in Harley Street.

Stoney left the hospital at the start of the war. Stoney had 13 years of experience in her field when World War I broke out in August 1914. Stoney and her sister Edith, a medical physicist, volunteered to assist the British Red Cross, but both were refused by surgeon Frederick Treves since they were women.

Despite the refusal, Stoney prepared an X-ray installation and helped to organise a unit of women volunteers alongside Mrs. St. Clair Stobart, Women's Imperial Service League and the Belgian Red Cross to aid the Belgian soldiers in Antwerp. The team converted an abandoned music hall into a makeshift hospital where Stoney managed the surgical unit as head of the medical staff and radiologist. The hospital came under fire and after enduring ongoing shellfire for 18 hours, the hospital was evacuated. The team walked to Holland, where they managed to cross the Scheldt River on buses carrying ammunition, 20 minutes before the bridge was blown up. She and her unit earned the 1914 Star for bravery.

She continued working in a hospital near Cherbourg in France, mainly dealing with cases relating to compound fractures and locating bullet fragments in wounds. During this time, Stoney became experienced in recognising dead bone and discovered that removing it would speed up recovery.

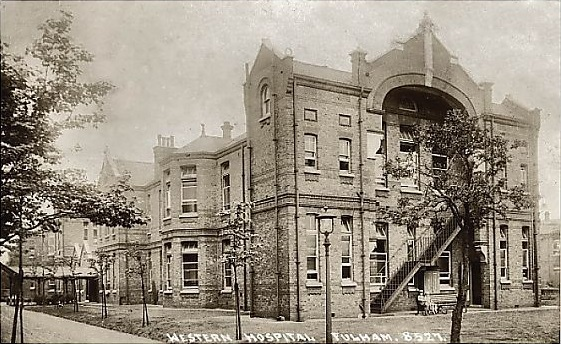
Fulham Hospital

In March 1915, the Cherbourg hospital was no longer needed and Stoney moved back London. She began full-time work at the 1000-bed Fulham Military Hospital. She was one of the first female physicians to serve as a full-time worker under the British War Office and went on to receive the Order of the British Empire in June 1919. She worked as the Head of the X-ray and Electrical Department and remained there until 1918.

== Later life and death ==
In her later years, Stoney suffered from ill health, largely attributed to her over-exposure to radiation in her work. It was reported that she had X-ray dermatitis of her left hand, a painful skin condition associated in modern times with radiation therapy as a treatment for cancer.

Stoney moved to the south coastal town of Bournemouth in England; here she was on the staff of two hospitals, practicing radiology part-time. She occupied the position of Honorary Medical Officer to the Electrical Department of the Royal Victoria and West Hants Hospital in Bournemouth. Stoney was the founder and president of the Wessex branch of the British Institute of Radiology. She served as the consulting actinotherapist at the Victoria Cripples Home.

During retirement she penned a number of articles in contribution to the medical literature of the time. She published research on topics such as fibroids, goitre, Graves' disease, soldier's heart, rickets and osteomalacia. Stoney retired from all of her hospital positions in 1928 at the age of 58. She, along with her older sister Edith, travelled in retirement. One trip was to India, where Stoney wrote her final scientific paper, the subject of which was osteomalacia (bone softening), in particular in relation to pelvic deformities in childbirth. She studied and investigated this topic overseas, and specifically the association between UV exposure, vitamin D and skeletal development. In India, she also used her expertise to advise on the use of UV light in hospitals.

Stoney died at the age of 62, on 7 October 1932. She was suffering from a long and painful illness, vertebral cancer, again largely attributed to her work in the presence of high levels of radiation. The British Journal of Radiology published her official obituary which spanned five pages, containing many warm personal testimonials. After her sister's death, Edith Stoney continued to travel and research.
