= NGC 5609 =

Galaxy in the constellation Boötes

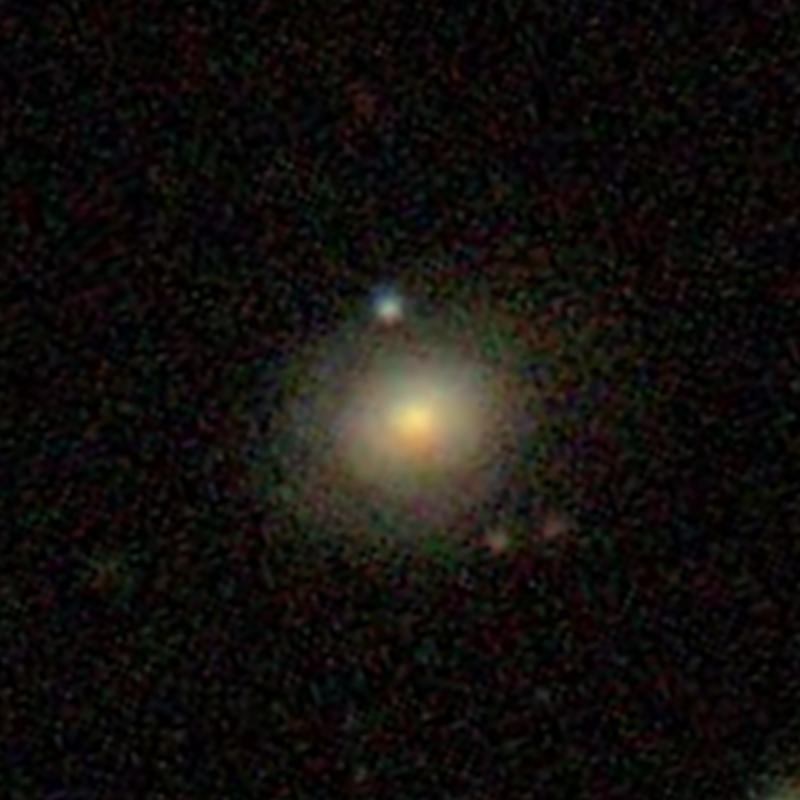
- SDSS image of NGC 5609.

Observation data (J2000 epoch)
- Constellation: Boötes
- Right ascension: 14^{h} 23^{m} 48.3^{s}
- Declination: 34° 50′ 34″
- Redshift: 0.100588
- Heliocentric radial velocity: 30156 km/s
- Distance: 1.32682 Gly (407 Mpc)
- Apparent magnitude (V): 15.7
- Apparent magnitude (B): 16.5

Characteristics
- Type: Sa?
- Size: ~175,230 ly (estimated)
- Apparent size (V): 0.38 x 0.31

Other designations
- PGC 3088538

NGC 5609 is a spiral galaxy located 1.3 billion light-years light-years away from Earth, in the constellation Boötes. It has the largest redshift of any galaxy in the New General Catalogue. Prior to 2023, another spiral galaxy, NGC 1262, had been thought to have a higher redshift. NGC 5609 is the most distant visually observed galaxy in the NGC Catalog and was discovered by civil engineer Bindon Blood Stoney on March 1, 1851.

== See also ==
- List of the most distant astronomical objects
- List of NGC objects (5001–6000)
