= George Johnstone Stoney =

Irish physicist (1826–1911)

George Stoney FRS
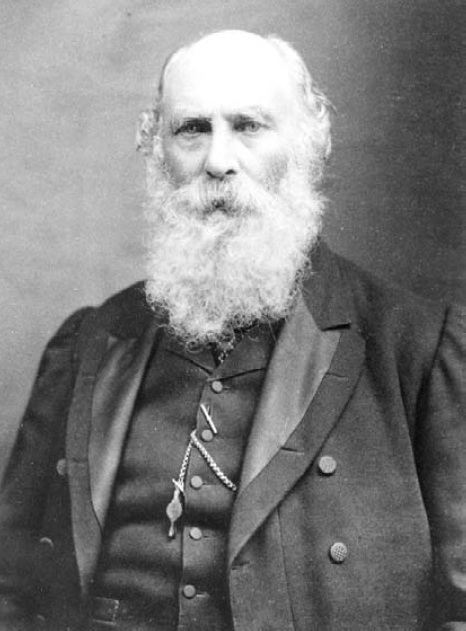
- Born: 15 February 1826; Clareen, Ireland, UKGBI
- Died: 5 July 1911 (aged 85); Notting Hill, London, UKGBI
- Resting place: St. Nahi's Church, Dublin, Ireland
- Education: Trinity College Dublin (BA)
- Known for: Coining the term electron; Stoney units
- Spouse: Margaret Sophia Stoney
- Children: 5, including Edith and Florence
- Relatives: Bindon Blood Stoney (brother); George Francis FitzGerald (nephew)
- Awards: FRS (1861); Boyle Medal (1899)
- Scientific career
- Fields: Physics
- Workplaces: Birr Castle (1848–52); Queen's College Galway (1852–57); Queen's University of Ireland (1857–82); Civil Service Examinations in Ireland (1882–93)

George Johnstone Stoney (15 February 1826 – 5 July 1911) was an Irish British physicist and academic who is best known for introducing the term electron as the "fundamental unit quantity of electricity"; he initially named it electrine in 1881, and later named it electron in 1891. He published around 75 scientific papers during his lifetime, and was the professor of Physics at Queen's College Galway from 1852 to 1857.

== Biography ==
George Johnstone Stoney was born on 15 February 1826 at Oakley Park in Clareen, Ireland, when Ireland was part of the United Kingdom, the son of George Stoney (1792–) and Anne Bindon Blood (1801–1883). The Stoney family is an old-established Anglo-Irish family.

Stoney attended Trinity College Dublin, graduating with a B.A. in 1848. From 1848 to 1852, he worked as an astronomy assistant to William Parsons, 3rd Earl of Rosse, at Birr Castle, where Parsons had built the world's largest telescope, the 72-inch Leviathan of Parsonstown.

From 1852 to 1857, Stoney was Professor of Physics at Queen's College Galway. From 1857 to 1882, he was Secretary of the Queen's University of Ireland, an administrative job based in Dublin. He continued his independent scientific research throughout his decades of non-scientific employment duties in Dublin. In 1882, he moved to the post of Superintendent of Civil Service Examinations in Ireland, a post he held until his retirement in 1893.

Stoney took up residence in London, England. He died at his home in Notting Hill on 5 July 1911 at the age of 85. His cremated ashes were brought back to Ireland to be buried at St. Nahi's Church in Dublin.

Stoney also served for decades as Honorary Secretary and then Vice President of the Royal Dublin Society, and after his move to London he served on the council of the Royal Society. Additionally, he intermittently served on scientific review committees of the British Association for the Advancement of Science from the early 1860s on.

== Research ==
Stoney published seventy-five scientific papers in a variety of journals, but chiefly in the journals of the Royal Dublin Society. He made significant contributions to cosmic physics and to the theory of gases. He estimated the number of molecules in a cubic millimetre of gas, at room temperature and pressure, from data obtained from the kinetic theory of gases. Stoney's most important scientific work was the conception and calculation of the magnitude of the "atom of electricity". In 1891, he proposed the term "electron" to describe the fundamental unit of electric charge, and his contributions to research in this area laid the foundations for the eventual discovery of the particle by J. J. Thomson in 1897.

His scientific work was carried out in his spare time. A heliostat designed by Stoney is in the Science Museum Group collection.

Stoney was elected a Fellow of the Royal Society in June 1861 on the basis of being the author of papers on "The Propagation of Waves", "On the Rings seen in Fibrous Specimens of Calc Spar", and Molecular Physics, published in the Transactions of the Royal Irish Academy, et cetera, Distinguished for his acquaintance with the science of Astronomy & General Physics.

=== Stoney units ===
Stoney proposed the first system of natural units in 1881. He realized that a fixed amount of charge was transferred per chemical bond affected during electrolysis, the elementary charge e, which could serve as a unit of charge, and that combined with other known universal constants, namely the speed of light c and the Newtonian constant of gravitation G, a complete system of units could be derived. He showed how to derive units of mass, length, time and electric charge as base units. Due to the form in which Coulomb's law was expressed, the constant 4πε_{0} was implicitly included, ε_{0} being the vacuum permittivity.

Like Stoney, Planck independently derived a system of natural units (of similar scale) some decades after him, using different constants of nature.

Hermann Weyl made a notable attempt to construct a unified theory by associating a gravitational unit of charge with the Stoney length. Weyl's theory led to significant mathematical innovations but his theory is generally thought to lack physical significance.

== Family ==
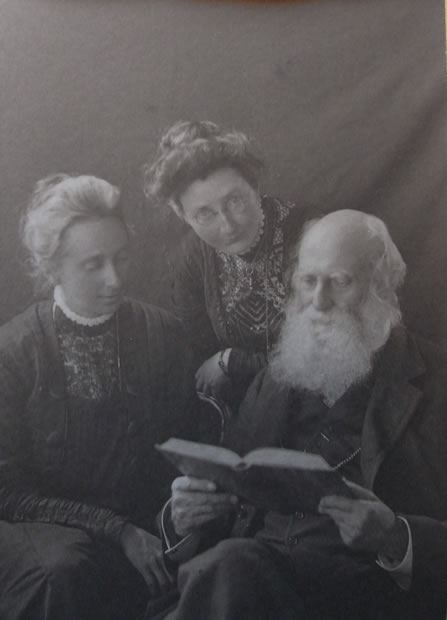
Edith, Florence and George Stoney, c. 1910

Stoney married his cousin, Margaret Sophia Stoney, with whom he had two sons and three daughters.

One of Stoney's sons, George Gerald Stoney, was a scientist. His daughter Florence was a radiologist, while his daughter Edith is considered to be the first woman medical physicist. His most scientifically notable relative was his nephew, the Dublin-based physicist George Francis FitzGerald.

His brother was the engineer Bindon Blood Stoney.

He was second cousin of the grandfather of Ethel Sara Turing, the mother of Alan Turing.

== Awards and honours ==
In 1899, Stoney became the first recipient of the Boyle Medal of the Royal Dublin Society.

Stoney received an honorary Doctor of Science (D.Sc.) from the University of Dublin in June 1902.

In 1902, Stoney was elected a Member of the American Philosophical Society.

Craters on Mars and the Moon are named in his honour.

== See also ==
- Basic concepts of quantum mechanics
- Planck units
- Stoney units

== Bibliography ==
- The Infancy of Atomic Physics. Hercules in His Cradle, by Alex Keller. Oxford University 1983. ISBN 0-19-853904-5 2013 reprint. Dover. 9 October 2013. ISBN 9780486149950.
- O'Hara, J. G. (1975). "George Johnstone Stoney, F.R.S., and the Concept of the Electron". Notes and Records of the Royal Society of London. 29 (2): 265–276. doi:10.1098/rsnr.1975.0018. JSTOR 531468. S2CID 145353314.
- Stoney, G. J. (1894). "Of the "Electron", or Atom of Electricity". Philosophical Magazine. Series 5. 38: 418–420.
- Barrow, J. D. (1983). "Natural Units Before Planck". Quarterly Journal of the Royal Astronomical Society. 24: 24. Bibcode:1983QJRAS..24...24B.
- "The Constants of Nature, by John D. Barrow, Jonathan Cape, London 2002.
