= NGC 379 =

Galaxy in the constellation Pisces

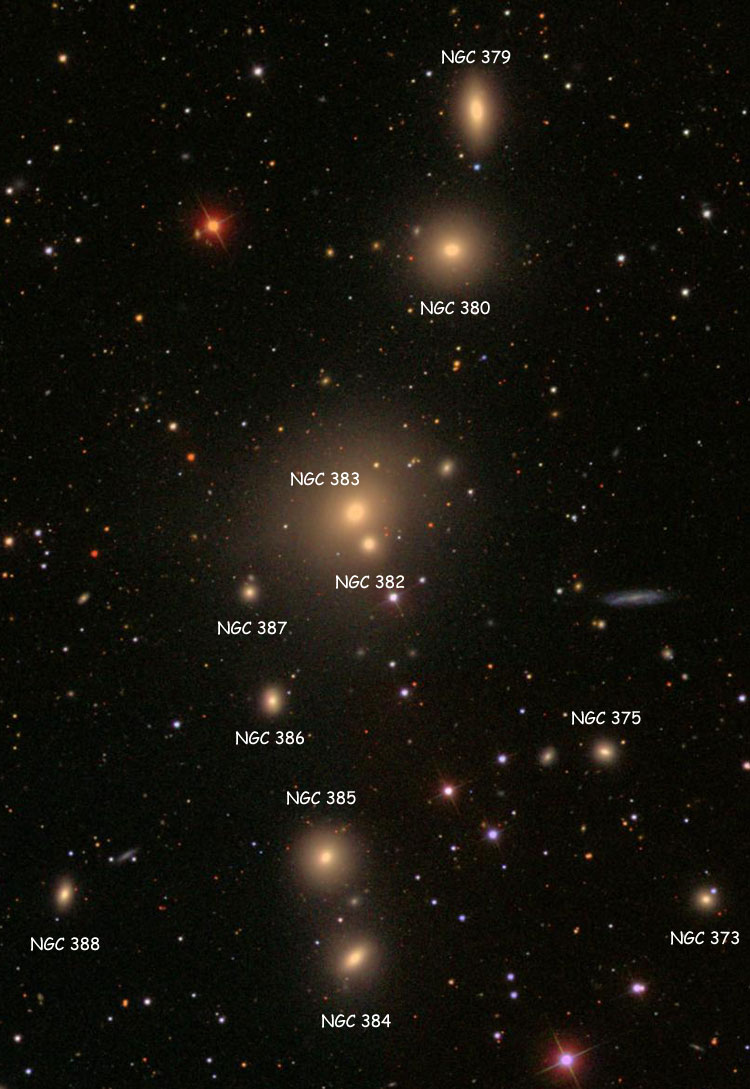
- SDSS image of NGC 379 and the galaxies of Arp 331

Observation data (J2000 epoch)
- Constellation: Pisces
- Right ascension: 01^{h} 07^{m} 15.7^{s}
- Declination: 32° 31′ 13″
- Redshift: 0.018606
- Heliocentric radial velocity: 5,578 km/s
- Distance: 195.5 million ly (59.944 mpc)
- Apparent magnitude (V): 12.8

Characteristics
- Type: S0
- Apparent size (V): 1.4 × 0.7

Other designations
- UGC 683, MCG +05-03-050, 2MASX J01071567+3231131, 2MASXi J0107156+323113, PGC 3966

NGC 379 is a lenticular galaxy in the constellation Pisces. It was discovered on September 12, 1784 by William Herschel. It was described by Dreyer as "pretty faint, small, round, brighter middle".
