= Bindon Blood Stoney =

Irish civil engineer (1828–1909)

Bindon Blood Stoney MRIA, FRS
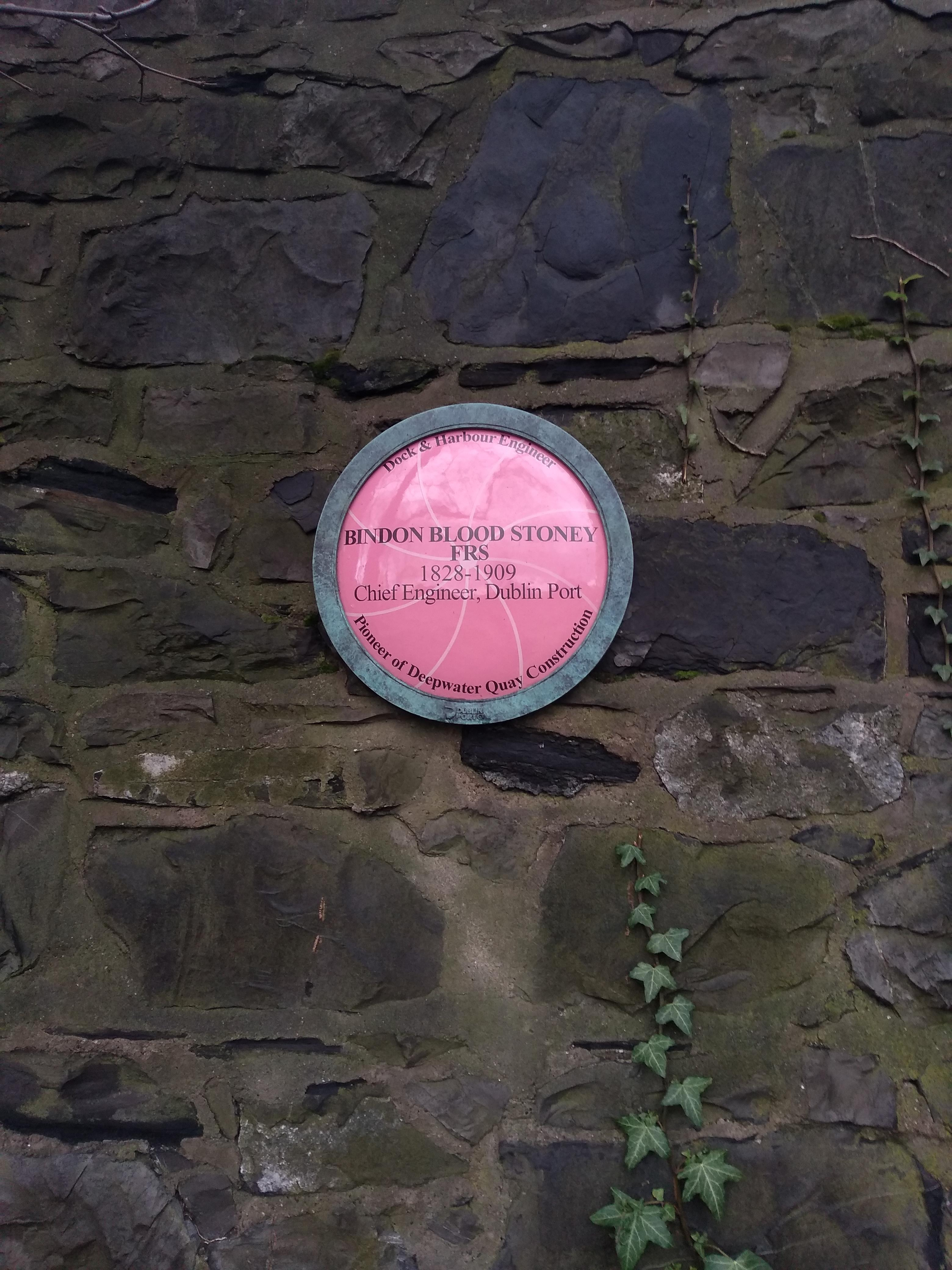
- Plaque to Stoney at the Dublin Port Centre
- Born: 13 June 1828; Oakley Park, King's County, Ireland
- Died: 5 May 1909 (aged 80); Dublin, County Dublin, Ireland
- Resting place: Mount Jerome cemetery
- Education: Trinity College Dublin, BA, 1850
- Spouse: Susannah Frances Walker (m. 1879)
- Children: 4
- Relatives: George Johnstone Stoney (brother); George Francis FitzGerald (nephew); Edith Anne Stoney (niece); Florence Stoney (niece)
- Engineering career
- Discipline: Civil
- Institutions: Institution of Civil Engineers of Ireland (president), Royal Society, Institution of Civil Engineers
- Projects: Dublin Harbour

Bindon Blood Stoney MRIA, FRS (13 June 1828 – 5 May 1909) was an Irish civil engineer, who served as the chief engineer of the Dublin Port and Docks Board from 1852 to 1898. In 1851, Stoney discovered the spiral galaxy NGC 5609.

== Early life and education ==
Stoney was born on 13 June 1828 in Oakley Park, King's County (present-day County Offaly) to George Stoney and Anne Stoney (née Blood; 1801–1883). The youngest of four siblings, Stoney was the brother of the physicist George Johnstone Stoney. On 30 March 1835, Stoney and his siblings were was baptised at the Newman Street Catholic Apostolic Church in Marylebone.

In 1850, Stoney graduated for Trinity College Dublin with a BA and a diploma in civil engineering with distinction.

== Career ==
=== Astronomy ===
In 1850–52, prior to beginning his engineering work, Stoney assisted William Parsons, 3rd Earl of Rosse at Parsonstown. There he accurately mapped the spiral form of the Andromeda Galaxy and observed 105 NGC objects and 8 IC objects. 91 NGC objects and all IC objects were new.

On 1 March 1851 he discovered the spiral galaxy NGC 5609, which is the most distant visually observed galaxy in the NGC catalogue.

=== Engineering ===
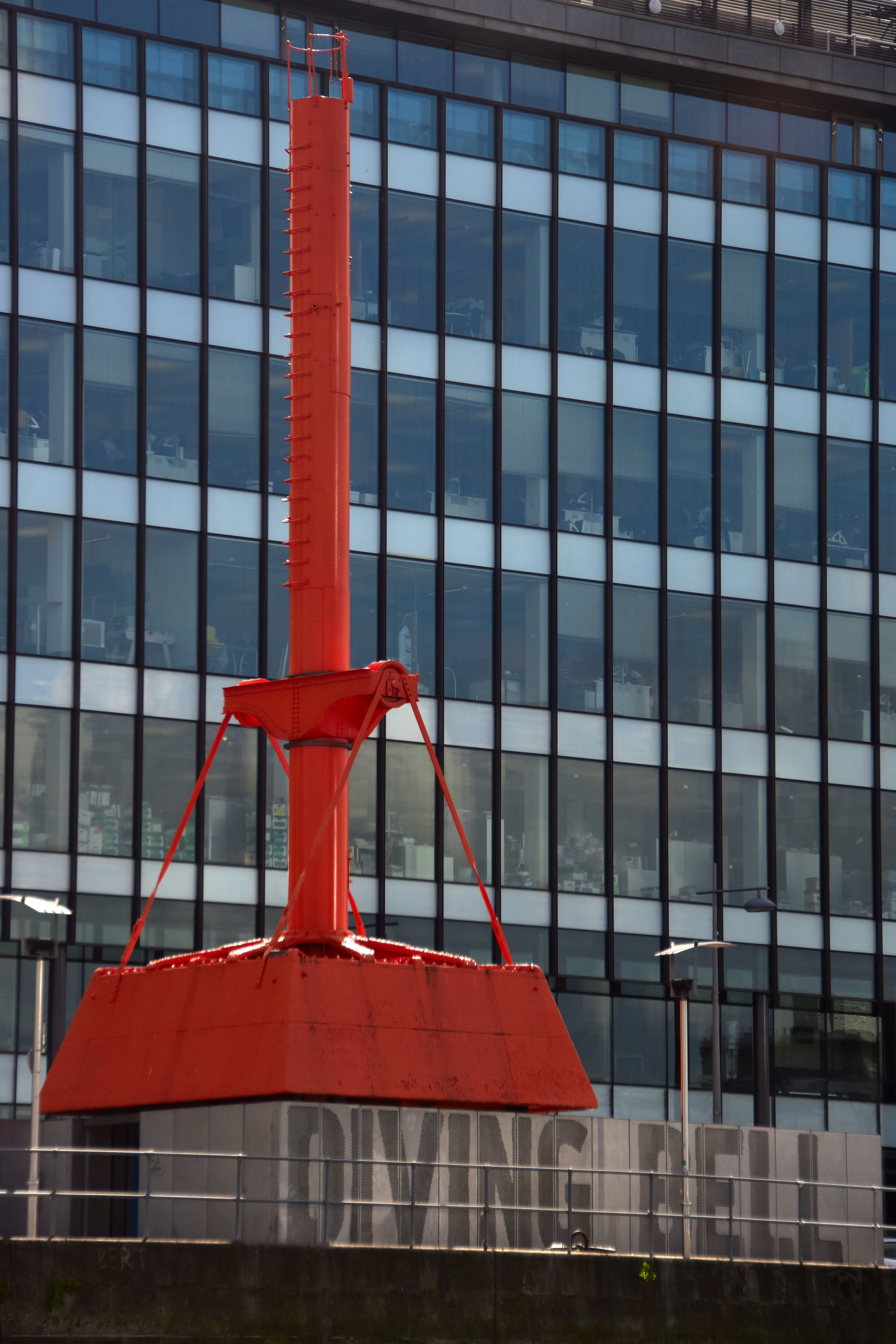
Diving bell, designed by Stoney, preserved on Sir John Rogerson's Quay, Dublin

Bindon's career in engineering commenced when he worked on surveys for the Aranjuez to Almansa railway in Spain from 1852 to 1853. Upon returning to Ireland in 1854, he was appointed as resident engineer under James Barton on the Boyne railway viaduct until its completion in 1855. This viaduct claimed to have the longest span in the world and had the world's longest girders at the time.

Bindon's groundbreaking work building a metal bridge with a span of such dimensions using shock-absorbent wrought-iron latticed bars instead of a continuity of plate with Barton was possibly the first of its kind. It was the basis for his later two-volume publication The theory of strains in girders and similar structures, with observations on the strength and other properties of materials (1866), nicknamed 'Stoney on strains' and reproduced in two further editions.

Bindon became an associate of the Institution of Civil Engineers (ICE) in January 1858 and a full member in November 1863.

In 1856, Bindon was appointed as assistant engineer to George Halpin Junior at the Ballast Board on Westmoreland Street and in 1859 he was appointed as Executive Engineer. Stoney was ambitious and an engineering innovator who had come up with a cheap way to develop the Dublin Port – something appreciated by the board but they also did not want to upset Halpin. When Halpin retired, Stoney became the new inspector of works and in 1868, he became the first chief engineer of the newly constituted Dublin Port and Docks Board.

Bindon designed a large dredging plant and rebuilt nearly 7,000 ft of quay walls along both north and south banks of the River Liffey, replacing the tidal berths by deep water berths. Additionally, the northern quays were lengthened eastwards and the formation of Alexandra Basin begun in 1871 and was partially completed by 1885. In addition to harbour works, Stoney was in charge of the design and construction of two major bridges that crossed the River Liffey. In 1872–1875 he largely rebuilt Essex Bridge, designed in the 1750s by George Semple to his own flamboyant design; it was renamed Grattan Bridge after Henry Grattan. In 1877–80 he redesigned the 1790s Carlisle Bridge of James Gandon, renamed O'Connell Bridge after Daniel O'Connell, to provide a crossing linking Sackville (later O'Connell) Street with the converging streets to the south. He built a new iron swing bridge in 1877–1879, just west of the Custom House named Beresford Bridge.

He invented a safe and efficient diving bell to excavate the riverbed which was in service between 1867 and 1959, and a means to lay down precast concrete. Towards the end of Bindon's career, he erected the North Bull lighthouse (1877–80) to replace the inadequate light on the Bull Wall marking the northern side of the Dublin port channel entrance opposite Poolbeg lighthouse before finally retiring in 1898.

=== Honours ===
Bindon was admitted to the Royal Irish Academy in 1857. Bindon was given an honorary degree by University College Dublin in recognition of his achievements and was later elected President of the Institution of Civil Engineers of Ireland in 1871. In 1874, he was awarded the Telford medal and Telford premium of the Institution of Civil Engineers for a paper documenting his work on the northern quays. Stoney was elected Fellow of the Royal Society on 2 June 1881.

Stoney Road in East Wall is named after Stoney.

== Personal life ==
Stoney married Susannah Frances Walker on 7 October 1879; they had four children. He is buried in Mount Jerome cemetery.

He was also the uncle of another Irish physicist George Francis FitzGerald, the son of his sister Anne Frances. His nieces were Edith Anne Stoney, a pioneer medical physicist, and Florence Stoney, the first female radiologist in the United Kingdom; both served in hospitals near the front line during World War I.

== Sources ==
- Ronald C. Cox, Bindon Blood Stoney: biography of a port engineer, Irish Engineering Publications, 1990, ISBN 978-0-904083-02-6.
