= NGC 383 =

Radio galaxy in the constellation Pisces

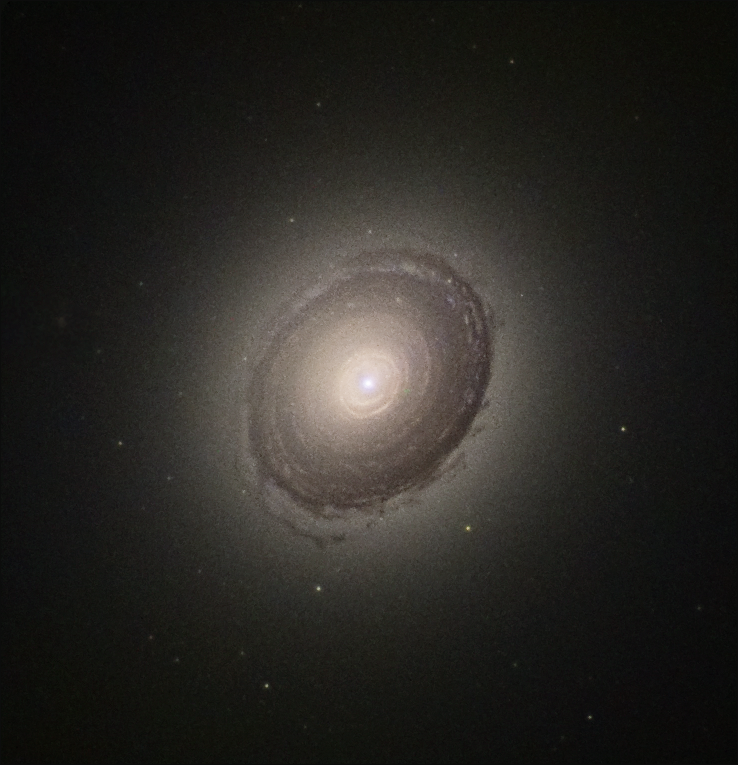
- Hubble Legacy Archive image of NGC 383

Observation data (J2000 epoch)
- Constellation: Pisces
- Right ascension: 01^{h} 07^{m} 24.968^{s}
- Declination: +32° 24′ 45.103″
- Redshift: 0.017005
- Galactocentric velocity: 5209 ± 10
- Distance: 209,000,000 ly 64 Mpc
- Group or cluster: NGC 452 Group
- Apparent magnitude (V): 13.4
- Apparent magnitude (B): 13.6
- Absolute magnitude (B): -21.69 ± 0.325
- Surface brightness: 23.70
- Magnitude (J): 9.489
- Magnitude (H): 8.761
- Magnitude (K): 8.481

Characteristics
- Type: S0
- Size: ~149,700 ly (45.91 kpc) (estimated)
- Apparent size (V): 2.34′ × 1.95′

Other designations
- 3C 31, 4C 32.05, QSO B0104+321, UGC 689, MCG +05-03-053, PGC 3982, CGCG 501-087, VV 193a

NGC 383 is a double radio galaxy with a quasar-like appearance located in the constellation Pisces. It was discovered by German-British astronomer William Herschel on 12 September 1784. It is listed as a part of Arp 331 in Halton Arp's Atlas of Peculiar Galaxies.

Recent discoveries by the National Radio Astronomy Observatory in 2006 reveal that NGC 383 is being bisected by high energy relativistic jets traveling at relatively high fractions of the speed of light. The relativistic electrons in the jets are detected as synchrotron radiation in the x-ray and radio wavelengths. The focus of this intense energy is the galactic center of NGC 383. The relativistic electron jets detected as synchrotron radiation extend for several thousand parsecs and then appear to dissipate at the ends in the form of streamers or filaments.

== NGC 452 Group ==
There are four other nearby galaxies NGC 379, NGC 380, NGC 385, and NGC 384 which are suspected of being closely associated with NGC 383, as well as several other galaxies at relatively close distance.

NGC 383 is considered to be part of a galaxy group known as LGG 18 or NGC 452 Group. It has at least 17 members, which are NGC 382, NGC 385, NGC 399, NGC 403, NGC 420, NGC 443, NGC 444, NGC 392, NGC 452, NGC 374, NGC 388, NGC 410, NGC 414, IC 1654, IC 1618 and IC 1652.

== Supernovae ==
Two supernovae have been observed in NGC 383:

- SN 2015ar (Type Ia, mag. 18.8) was discovered by E. Conseil and G. Arlic on 11 November 2015.
- SN 2017hle (Type Ia, mag. 18) was discovered by Xingming Observatory Sky Survey (XOSS) on 18 October 2017.

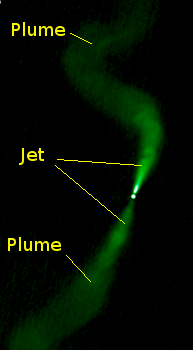
Two jets coming from 3C 31.

== See also ==
- Relativistic beaming
- Relativistic jets
