= NGC 394 =

Lenticular galaxy in the constellation Pisces

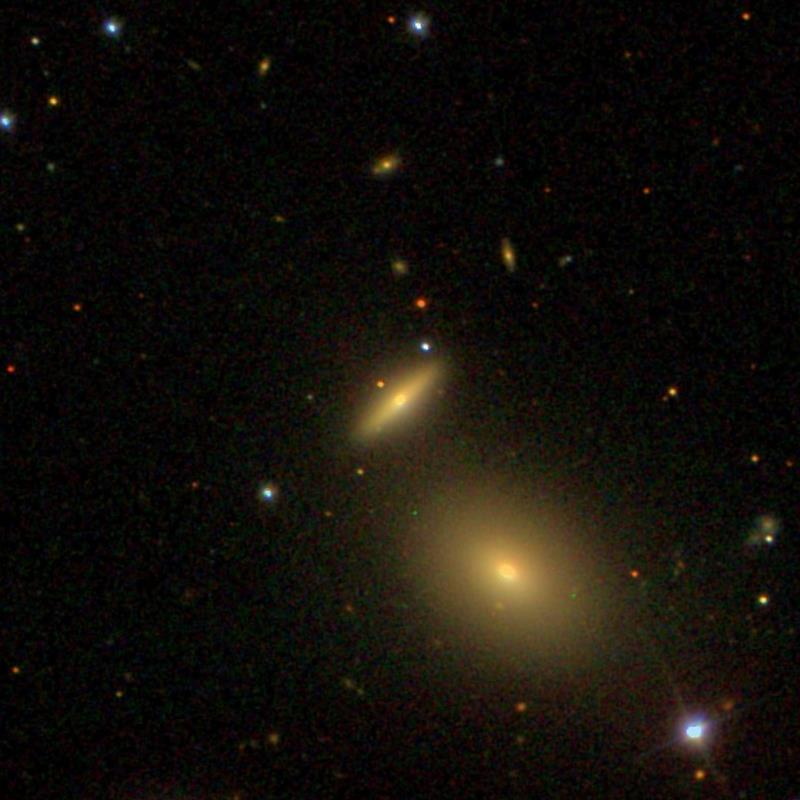
- SDSS image of NGC 394 (center), NGC 392 can be seen in the lower right

Observation data (J2000 epoch)
- Constellation: Pisces
- Right ascension: 01^{h} 08^{m} 26.0^{s}
- Declination: +33° 08′ 53″
- Redshift: 0.014754
- Heliocentric radial velocity: 4,423 km/s
- Apparent magnitude (V): 14.8

Characteristics
- Type: S0
- Apparent size (V): 0.4' × 0.2'

Other designations
- CGCG 501-095, MCG +05-03-063, 2MASX J01082606+3308529, 2MASXi J0108260+330852, PGC 4049.

NGC 394 is a lenticular galaxy located in the constellation Pisces. It was discovered on October 26, 1854 by R. J. Mitchell. It was described by Dreyer as "faint, small, 50 arcsec northeast of II 218.", with II 218 being NGC 392.

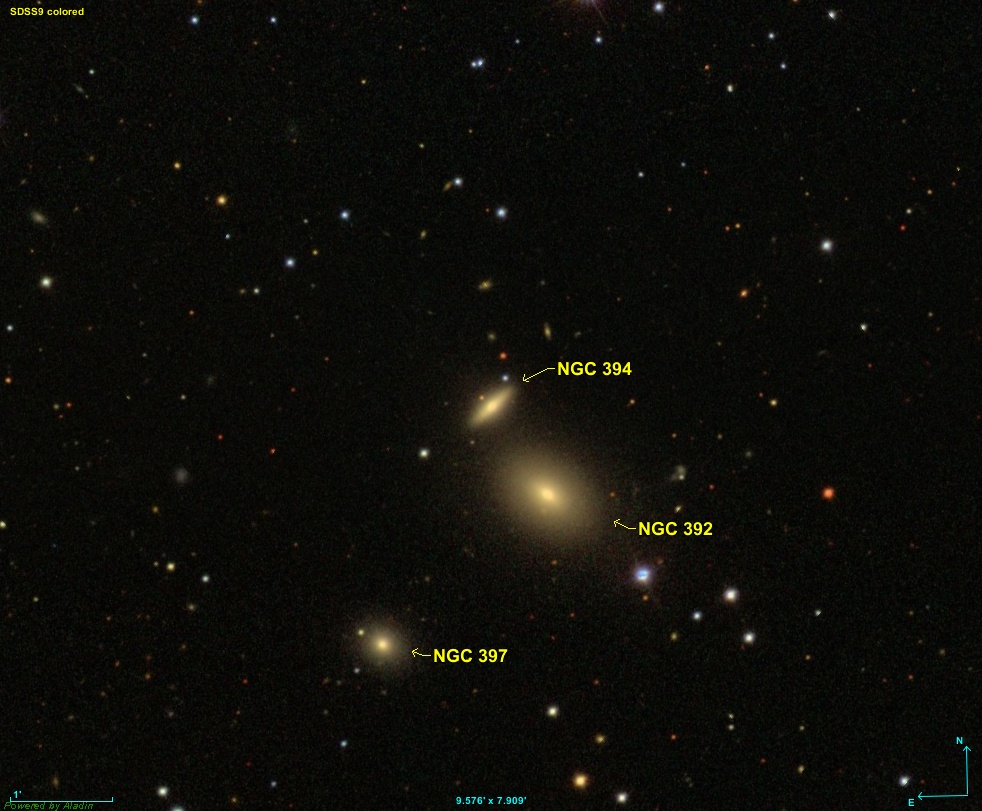
NGC 394, NGC 392, and NGC 397 (SDSS)
