= NGC 5384 =

Galaxy in the constellation Virgo

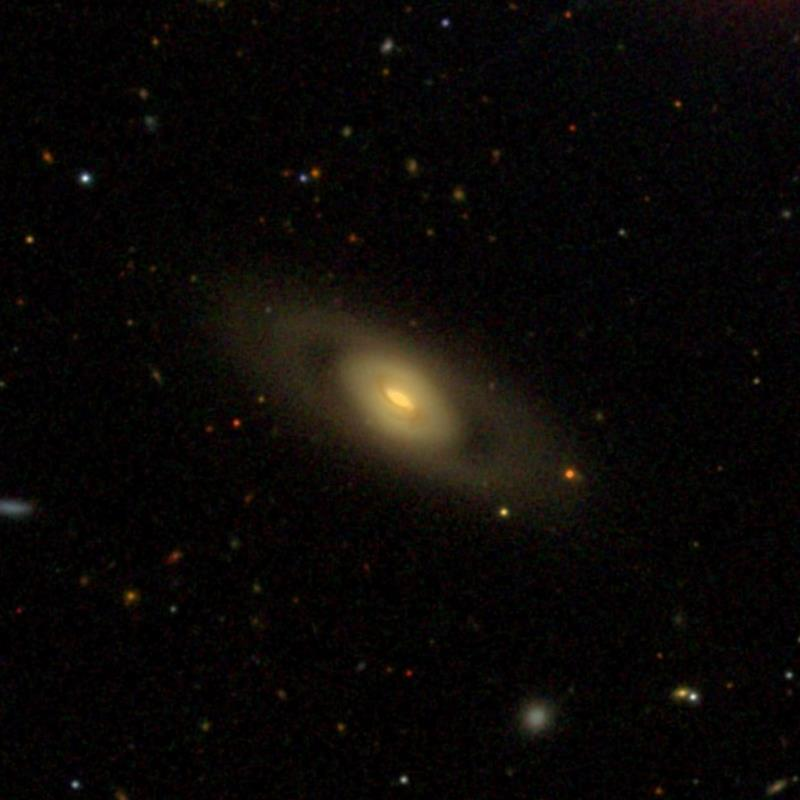
- SDSS image of NGC 5384

Observation data (J2000 epoch)
- Constellation: Virgo
- Right ascension: 13^{h} 58^{m} 12.850^{s}
- Declination: +06° 31′ 04.80″
- Redshift: 0.01699
- Heliocentric radial velocity: 5050 ± 3 km/s
- Distance: 258.3 ± 18.2 Mly (79.21 ± 5.57 Mpc)
- Group or cluster: NGC 5374 group (LGG 368)

Characteristics
- Type: S0
- Apparent size (V): 0.617′ × 0.419′

Other designations
- UGC 8886, MCG +01-36-008, PGC 49707

NGC 5384 is a lenticular galaxy in the constellation Virgo. It was discovered on May 8, 1864, by the astronomer Albert Marth. It is located about 250 million light-years (79.21 megaparsecs) away.

== NGC 5374 group ==
According to A. M. Garcia, NGC 5384 is a member of a group of galaxies. The NGC 5374 group (also known as LGG 368) contains at least eight galaxies, including NGC 5374, NGC 5382, NGC 5386, NGC 5417, NGC 5418, NGC 5434, and UGC 8906.
