= NGC 217 =

Lenticular galaxy in the constellation Cetus

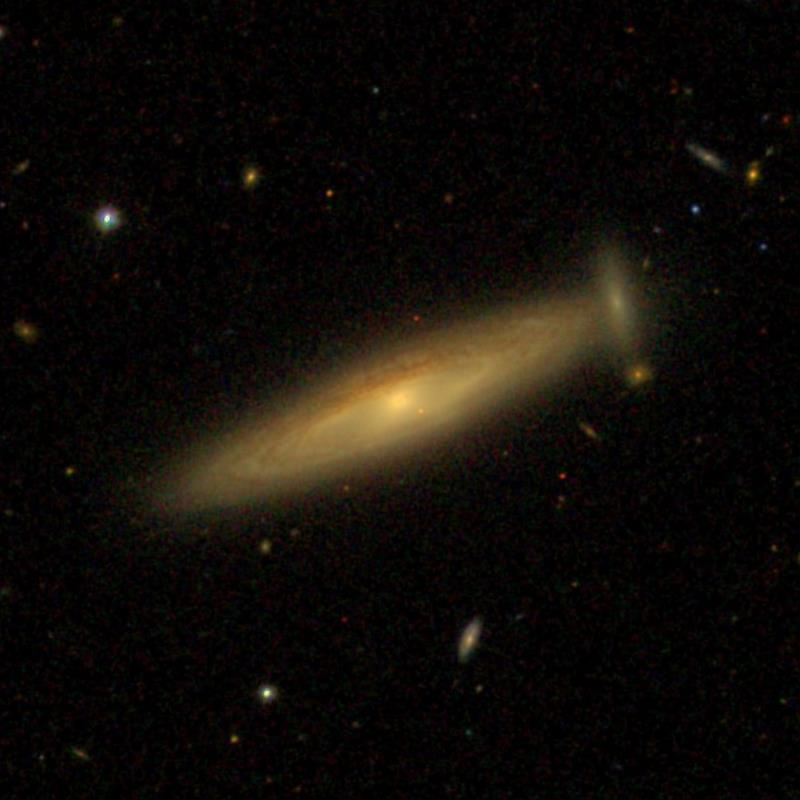
- SDSS view of NGC 217

Observation data (J2000 epoch)
- Constellation: Cetus
- Right ascension: 00^{h} 41^{m} 33.9^{s}
- Declination: −10° 01′ 17″
- Redshift: 0.013262
- Distance: 178 Mly
- Apparent magnitude (V): 13.0g

Characteristics
- Type: S0/a
- Apparent size (V): 2.05' × 0.68'

Other designations
- MCG -02-02-085, 2MASX J00413390-1001169, 2MASXi J0041339-100117, IRAS F00390-1017, 6dF J0041339-100117, PGC 2482.

NGC 217 is a spiral or lenticular galaxy located approximately 178 light-years from the Solar System in the constellation Cetus. It was discovered on November 28, 1785 by William Herschel.

NGC 217 is part of galaxy group known as LGG 8, together with NGC 151, MCG 2-2-30 and MCG 2-2-38.

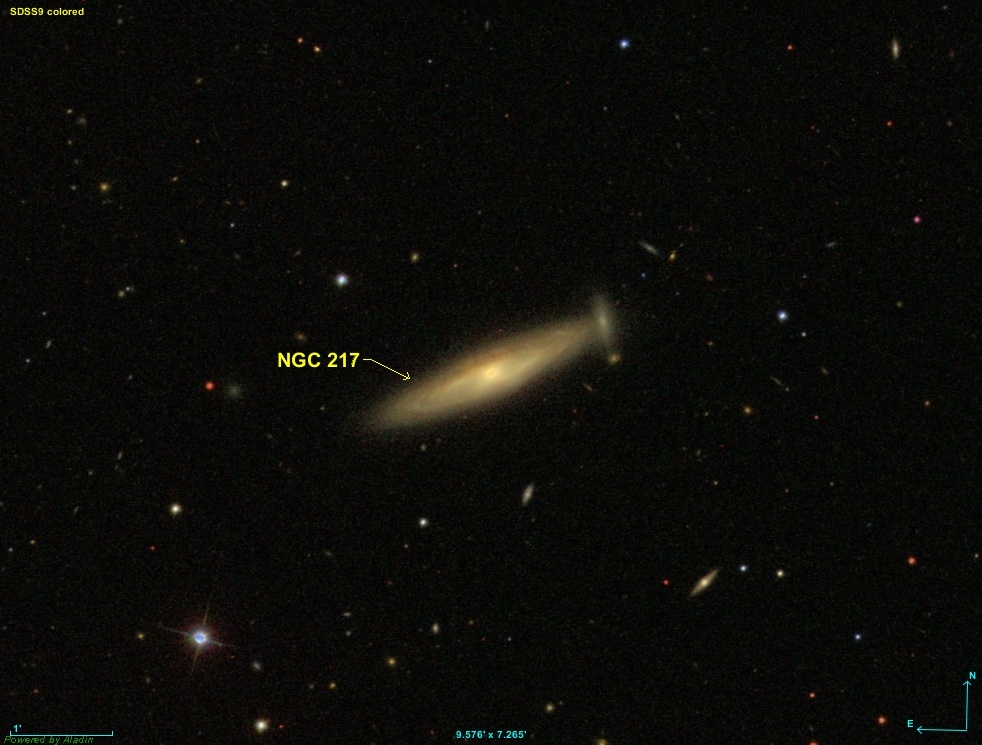
NGC 217 (SDSS)

== See also ==
- List of NGC objects (1–1000)
