= NGC 399 =

Galaxy in the constellation Pisces

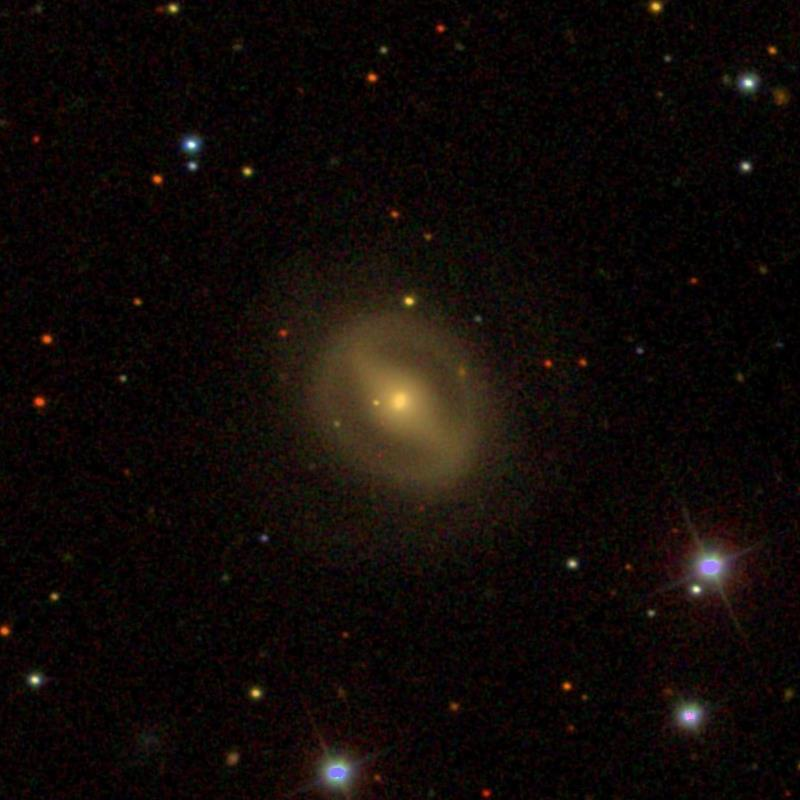
- SDSS image of NGC 399

Observation data (J2000 epoch)
- Constellation: Pisces
- Right ascension: 01^{h} 08^{m} 59.2^{s}
- Declination: +32° 38′ 04″
- Redshift: 0.017235
- Heliocentric radial velocity: 5,167 km/s
- Apparent magnitude (V): 14.45

Characteristics
- Type: SBa:
- Apparent size (V): 0.9' × 0.7'

Other designations
- UGC 00712, CGCG 501-101, MCG +05-03-067, 2MASX J01085920+3238037, 2MASXi J0108592+323803, PGC 4096.

NGC 399 is a barred spiral galaxy located in the constellation Pisces. It was discovered on October 7, 1874, by Lawrence Parsons. It was described by Dreyer as "very faint, small, round."

NGC 399 is considered to be part of a galaxy group known as LGG 18 or NGC 452 Group. It has at least 17 members, which are NGC 383, NGC 385, NGC 382, NGC 403, NGC 420, NGC 443, NGC 444, NGC 392, NGC 452, NGC 374, NGC 388, NGC 410, NGC 414, IC 1654, IC 1618 and IC 1652.

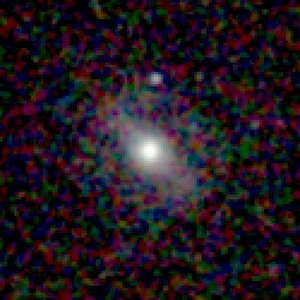
2MASS (near-infrared)
