= NGC 388 =

Galaxy in the constellation Pisces

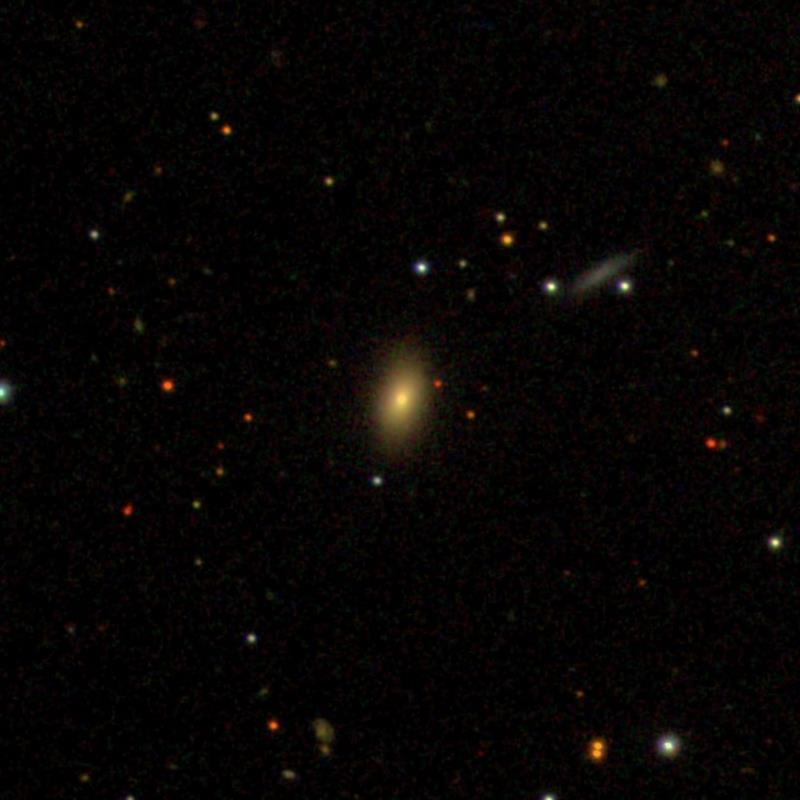
- SDSS image of NGC 388

Observation data (J2000 epoch)
- Constellation: Pisces
- Right ascension: 01^{h} 07^{m} 47.1^{s}
- Declination: +32° 18′ 36″
- Redshift: 0.018159
- Heliocentric radial velocity: 5,444 km/s
- Apparent magnitude (V): 15.42

Characteristics
- Type: E3:
- Apparent size (V): 0.9' × 0.8'

Other designations
- CGCG 501-090, MCG +05-03-059, 2MASX J01074719+3218532, 2MASXi J0107471+321835, PGC 4005.

NGC 388 is an elliptical galaxy located in the constellation Pisces. It was discovered on November 4, 1850, by Bindon Stoney. It was described by Dreyer as "very faint, small, round." Along with galaxies NGC 375, NGC 379, NGC 382, NGC 383, NGC 384, NGC 385, NGC 386 and NGC 387, NGC 388 forms a galaxy cluster called Arp 331.

NGC 388 is considered to be part of a galaxy group known as LGG 18 or NGC 452 Group. It has at least 17 members, which are NGC 383, NGC 385, NGC 399, NGC 403, NGC 420, NGC 443, NGC 444, NGC 392, NGC 452, NGC 374, NGC 382, NGC 410, NGC 414, IC 1654, IC 1618 and IC 1652.
