= NGC 7721 =

Galaxy in the constellation Aquarius

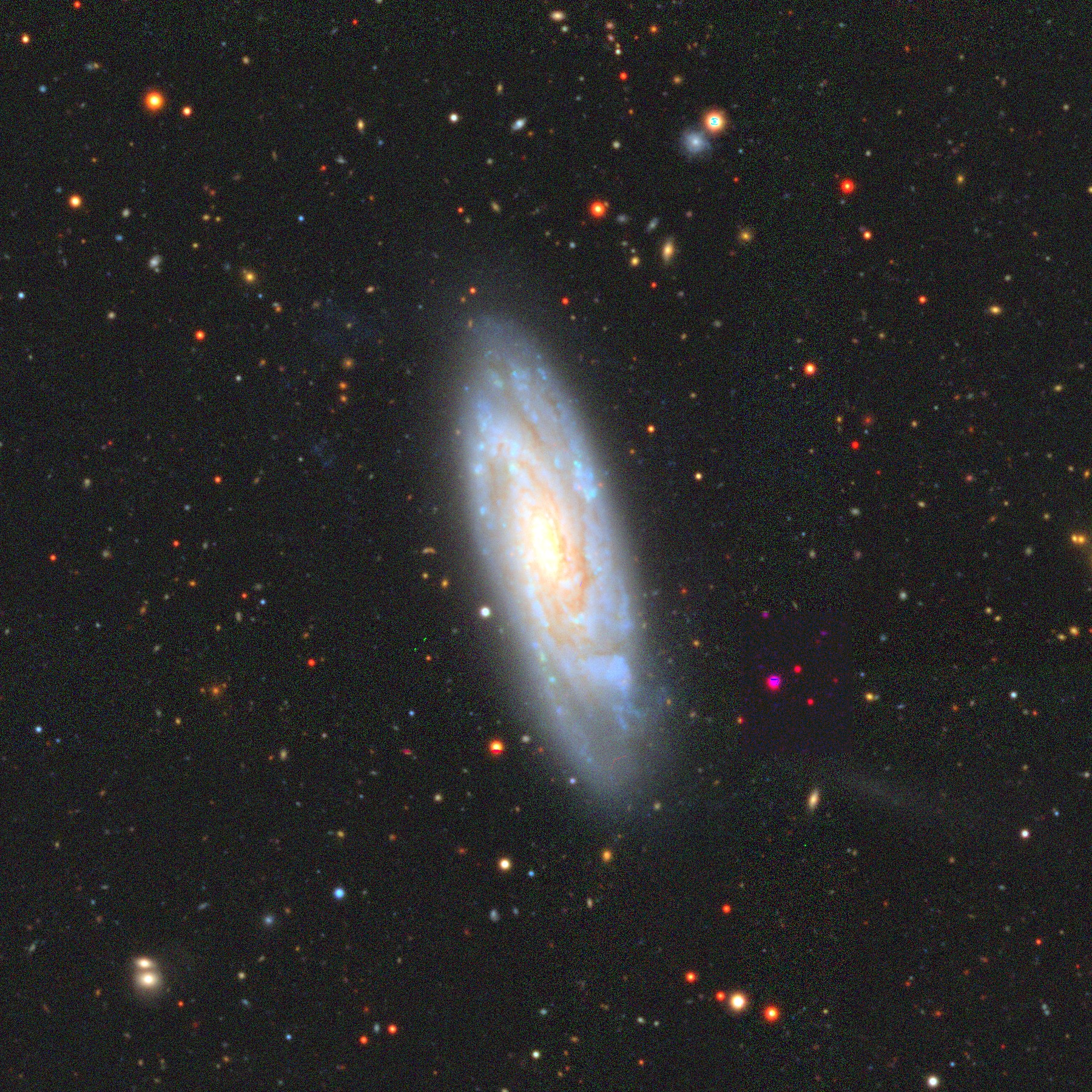
- NGC 7721 imaged by Legacy Surveys

Observation data (J2000 epoch)
- Constellation: Aquarius
- Right ascension: 23^{h} 38^{m} 48.65^{s}
- Declination: −06° 31′ 04.30″
- Redshift: 0.006728 ± 2.00e-6
- Distance: 79 Mly (24.47 Mpc)
- Apparent magnitude (V): 11.6
- Magnitude (J): 9.528
- Magnitude (H): 8.878
- Magnitude (K): 8.682

Characteristics
- Type: SA(s)c
- Size: 70,000 ly
- Apparent size (V): 3.5′ × 1.4′

Other designations
- PGC 72001, AGC 630233, IRAS 23362-0647, LEDA 72001

NGC 7721 is a spiral galaxy located around 79 million light-years away in the constellation Aquarius. NGC 7721 was discovered on September 10, 1785, by the astronomer William Herschel, and its diameter is 70,000 light-years across. NGC 7721 is not known to have much star formation, and it is not known to have an active galactic nucleus.

== NGC 7721 Group ==
It is part of a galaxy group known as LGG 481. It is a galaxy group formed by 3 galaxies, which is NGC 7721, MCG 1-60-16 and MCG 1-60-26.

== Supernova ==
One supernova has been observed in NGC 7721.

- 2007le (Type Ia, mag. 15.2) was discovered by Berto Monard on 13 October 2007.
