= NGC 252 =

Lenticular galaxy in constellation Andromeda

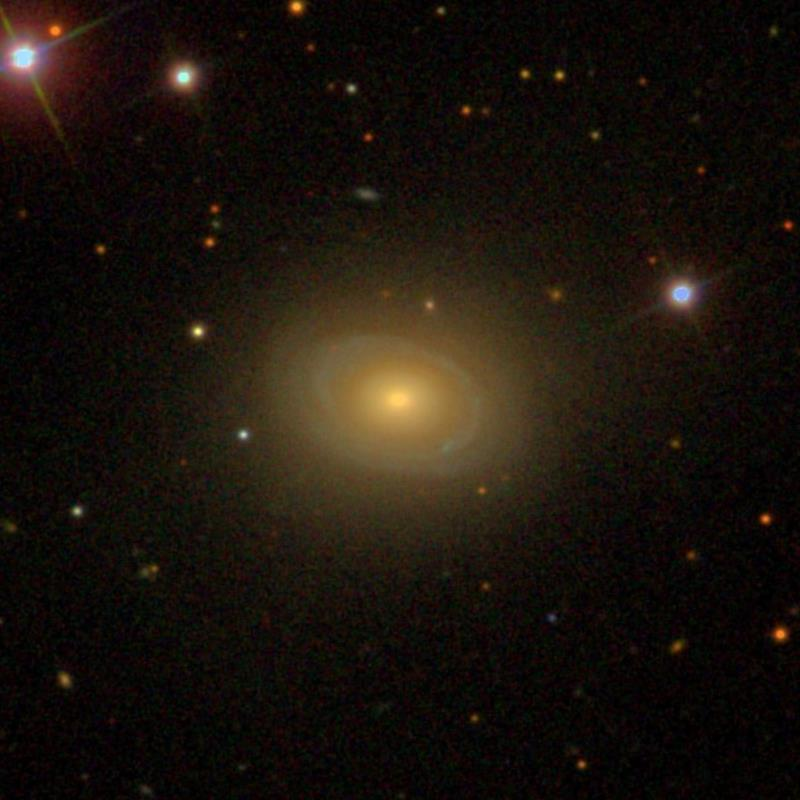
- SDSS image of NGC 252

Observation data (J2000 epoch)
- Constellation: Andromeda
- Right ascension: 00^{h} 48^{m} 01.484^{s}
- Declination: +27° 37′ 25.76″
- Redshift: 0.016471
- Heliocentric radial velocity: 4938
- Distance: 245.54 ± 31.56 Mly (75.283 ± 9.677 Mpc)
- Apparent magnitude (V): 13.4
- Apparent magnitude (B): 12.49

Characteristics
- Type: (R)SA0^{+}(r)
- Size: 121.4 kly (37.23 kpc)
- Apparent size (V): 1.7′ × 1.309′

Other designations
- UGC 491, MGC+04-03-004, PGC 2819

NGC 252 is a lenticular galaxy located in the constellation Andromeda. It was discovered by William Herschel in 1786.

NGC 252 is part of a galaxy group known as LGG 12, which has 5 members, NGC 260, UGC 501, UGC 470 and CGCG 500-92.

== Supernova ==
One supernova has been observed in NGC 252:

- SN 1998de (Type Ia, mag. 18.4) was discovered by the Lick Observatory Supernova Search (LOSS) on 23 July 1998.

== See also ==
- List of NGC objects
