= NGC 374 =

Spiral or lenticular galaxy in the constellation Pisces

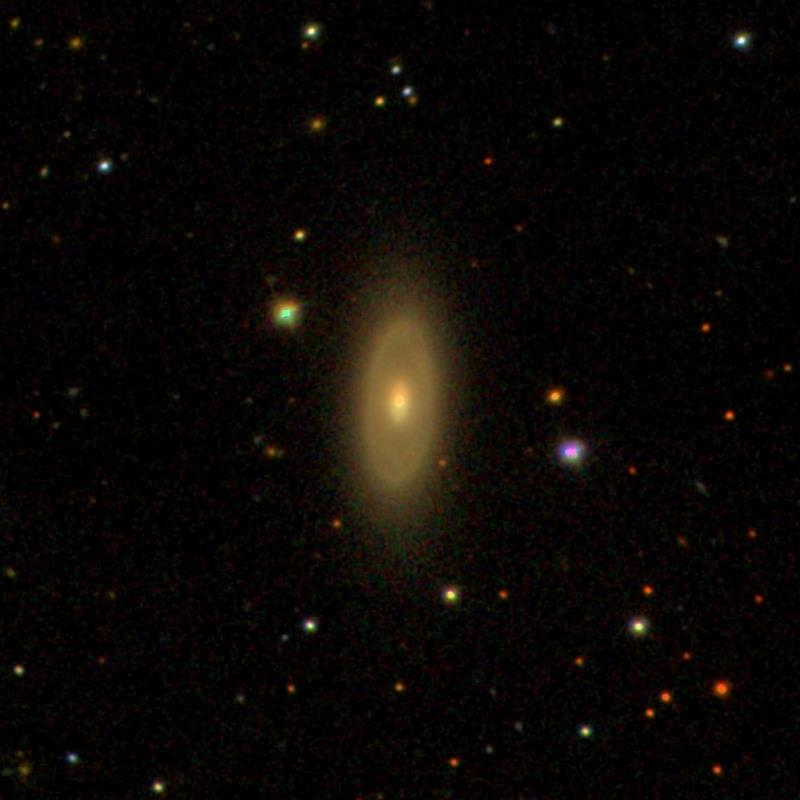
- SDSS image of NGC 374

Observation data (J2000 epoch)
- Constellation: Pisces
- Right ascension: 01^{h} 07^{m} 05.8^{s}
- Declination: +32° 47′ 42″
- Redshift: 0.016782
- Heliocentric radial velocity: 5,031 km/s
- Apparent magnitude (V): 14.36
- Apparent magnitude (B): 14.3
- magnitude (J): 10.84
- magnitude (H): 10.17
- magnitude (K): 9.98

Characteristics
- Type: S0/a
- Apparent size (V): 1.1' × 0.5'

Other designations
- UGC 00680, CGCG 501-080, MCG +05-03-048, 2MASX J01070577+3247425, 2MASXi J0107057-324742, PGC 3952.

NGC 374 is a spiral or lenticular galaxy located in the constellation Pisces. It was discovered on October 7, 1861, by Heinrich d'Arrest. It was described by Dreyer as "faint, small, between two 15th magnitude stars."

NGC 374 is considered to be part of a galaxy group known as LGG 18 or NGC 452 Group. It has at least 17 members, which are NGC 383, NGC 385, NGC 399, NGC 403, NGC 420, NGC 443, NGC 444, NGC 392, NGC 452, NGC 382, NGC 388, NGC 410, NGC 414, IC 1654, IC 1618 and IC 1652.
