= NGC 862 =

Elliptical galaxy in the constellation Phoenix

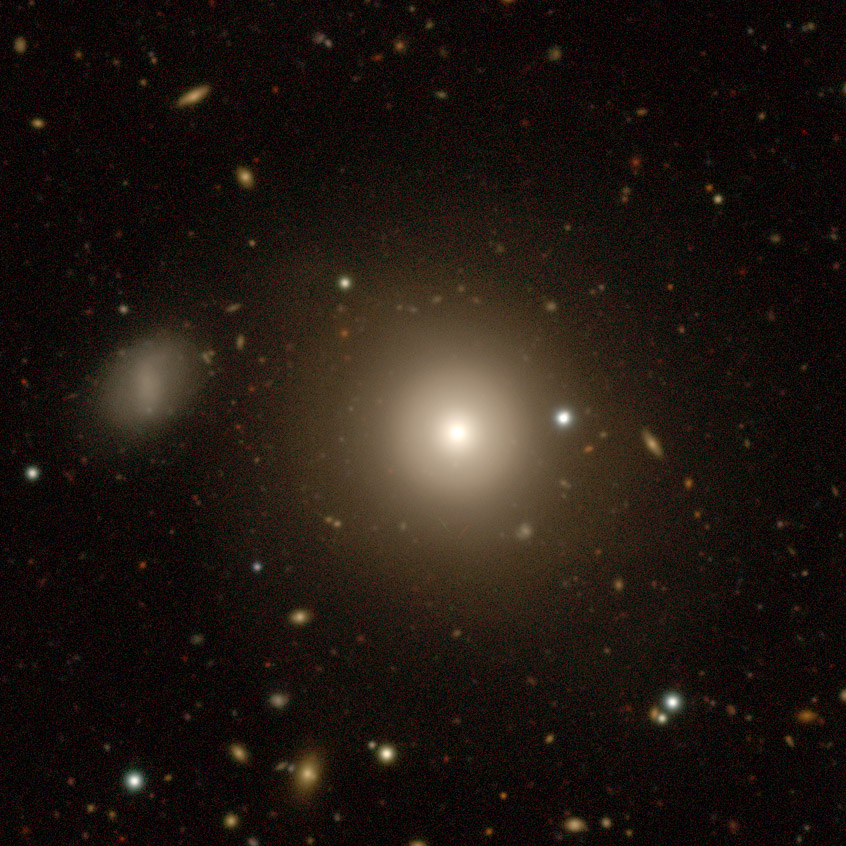
- legacy survey image of NGC 862

Observation data (J2000 epoch)
- Constellation: Phoenix
- Right ascension: 02^{h} 13^{m} 02.98434^{s}
- Declination: −42° 02′ 00.6071″
- Redshift: 0.017659
- Heliocentric radial velocity: 5247 km/s
- Distance: 236.7 Mly (72.57 Mpc)
- Apparent magnitude (B): 13.86

Characteristics
- Type: E

Other designations
- MCG -07-05-012, PGC 8487

NGC 862 is an elliptical galaxy located in the constellation of Phoenix about 241 million light years from the Milky Way. It was discovered by the British astronomer John Herschel in 1834.

NGC 862 is a member of the NGC 822 group (also known as LGG 50), which contains three galaxies, including NGC 822 and ESO 298-8.

== See also ==
- List of NGC objects (1–1000)
