= NGC 414 =

Pair of galaxies in the constellation Pisces

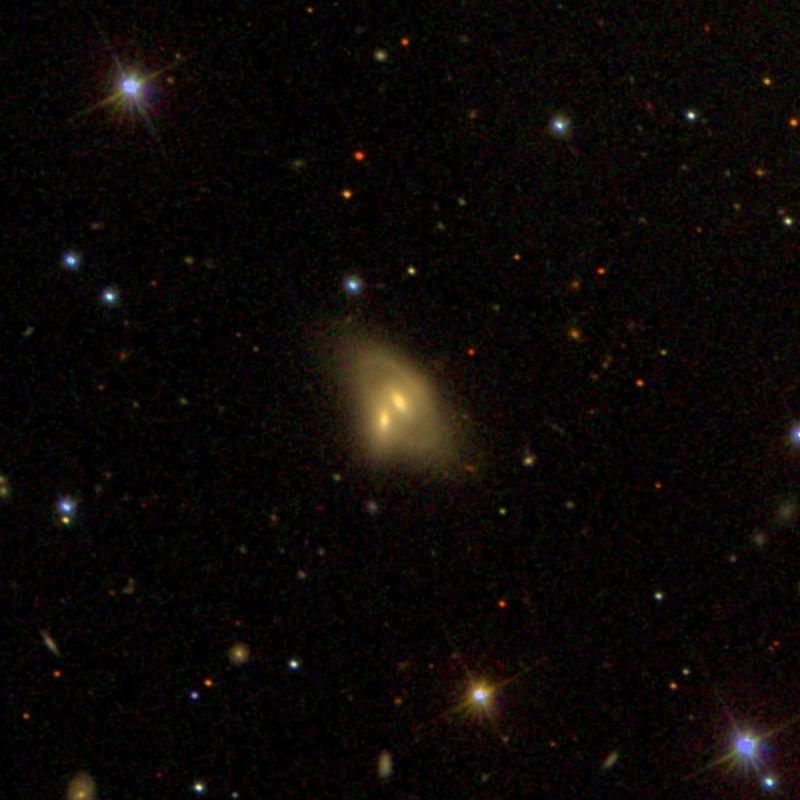
- SDSS image of NGC 414

Observation data (J2000 epoch)
- Constellation: Pisces
- Right ascension: 01^{h} 11^{m} 17.8^{s}
- Declination: +33° 06′ 46″
- Redshift: 0.015778
- Heliocentric radial velocity: 4,730 km/s
- Apparent magnitude (V): 14.5
- Absolute magnitude (V): -19.44

Characteristics
- Type: S0 and E/S0
- Apparent size (V): 0.8'

Other designations
- UGC 00744, CGCG 501-123, PGC 4254.

NGC 414 is a pair of lenticular galaxies (PGC 4254 and PGC 93079) of types S0 and E/S0, respectively, located in the constellation Pisces. It was discovered on October 22, 1867 by Herman Schultz. It was described by Dreyer as "very faint, small, irregularly round, much brighter middle, II 220 to the northwest.", with II 220 being NGC 410.

== Supernova ==
One supernova has been observed in NGC 414: PTF13dzm (Type Ia, mag. 17.1) was discovered by the Palomar Transient Factory on 8 November 2013.

== NGC 452 Group ==
NGC 414 is considered to be part of a galaxy group known as LGG 18 or NGC 452 Group. It has at least 17 members, which are NGC 383, NGC 385, NGC 399, NGC 403, NGC 420, NGC 443, NGC 444, NGC 392, NGC 452, NGC 374, NGC 388, NGC 410, NGC 382, IC 1654, IC 1618 and IC 1652.

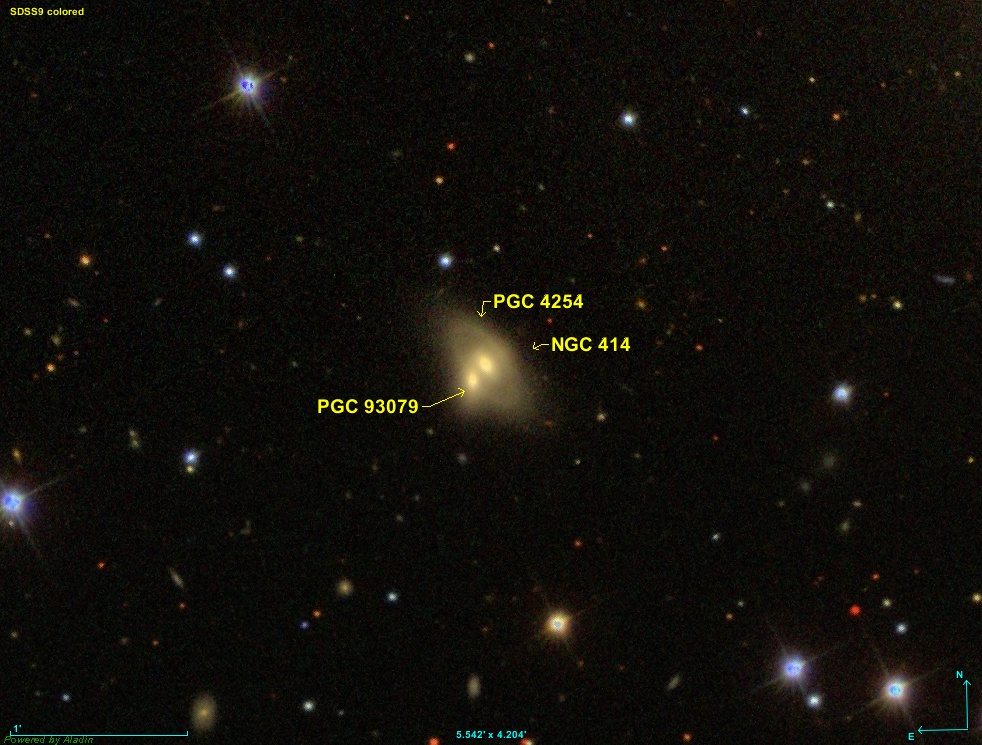
NGC 414 (SDSS)
