= NGC 410 =

Galaxy in the constellation Pisces

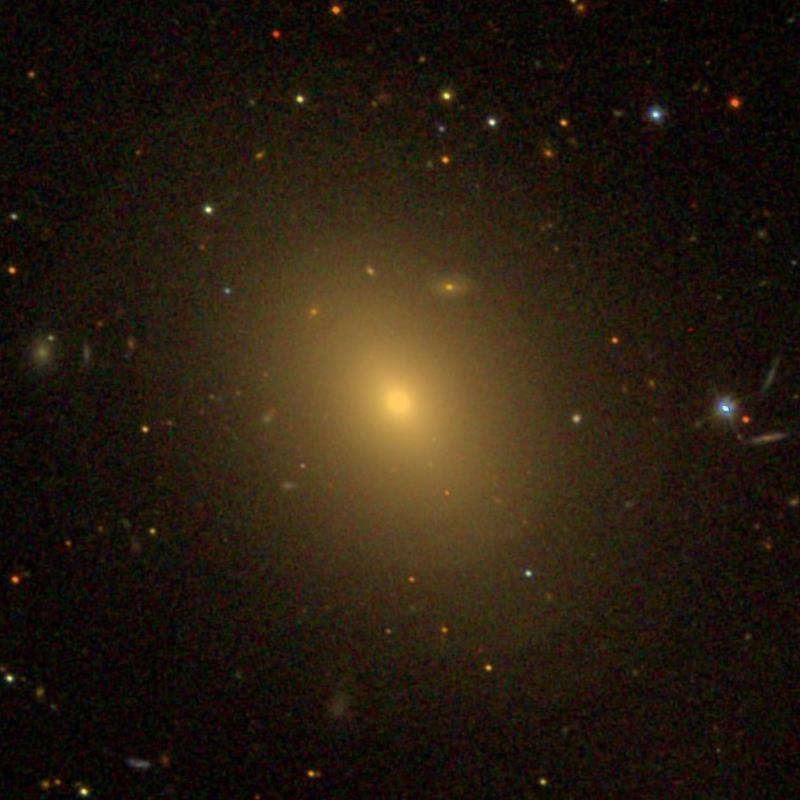
- SDSS image of NGC 410

Observation data (J2000 epoch)
- Constellation: Pisces
- Right ascension: 01^{h} 10^{m} 58.9^{s}
- Declination: +33° 09′ 07″
- Redshift: 0.017659
- Heliocentric radial velocity: 5,294 km/s
- Apparent magnitude (V): 12.52

Characteristics
- Type: E
- Apparent size (V): 2.4' × 1.3'

Other designations
- UGC 00735, CGCG 501-118, MCG +05-03-080, 2MASX J01105887+3209072, PGC 4224.

NGC 410 is an elliptical galaxy located in the constellation Pisces. It was discovered on September 12, 1784 by William Herschel. It was described by Dreyer as "pretty bright, pretty large, northeastern of 2.", the other being NGC 407.

One supernova has been observed in NGC 410: SN 1995Y (Type I, mag. 18) was discovered by Jean Mueller on 28 August 1995.

NGC 410 is considered to be part of a galaxy group known as LGG 18 or NGC 452 Group. It has at least 17 members, which are NGC 383, NGC 385, NGC 399, NGC 403, NGC 420, NGC 443, NGC 444, NGC 392, NGC 452, NGC 374, NGC 388, NGC 382, NGC 414, IC 1654, IC 1618 and IC 1652.
