= NGC 684 =

Spiral galaxy in the constellation Triangulum

- NGC 684 imaged by Legacy Surveys

Observation data (J2000.0 epoch)
- Constellation: Triangulum
- Right ascension: 01^{h} 50^{m} 14.0407^{s}
- Declination: +27° 38′ 44.472″
- Redshift: 0.011798
- Heliocentric radial velocity: 3537 ± 1 km/s
- Distance: 135.03 ± 3.13 Mly (41.400 ± 0.960 Mpc)
- Group or cluster: NGC 684 group (LGG 32)
- Apparent magnitude (V): 12.50
- Apparent magnitude (B): 13.30

Characteristics
- Type: Sb edge-on
- Size: ~137,500 ly (42.15 kpc) (estimated)
- Apparent size (V): 3.2′ × 0.6′

Other designations
- IRAS 01474+2724, IC 165, UGC 1292, MCG +04-05-017, PGC 6759, CGCG 482-022

NGC 684 is a spiral galaxy approximately 135 million light-years away from Earth in the constellation of Triangulum. It was discovered by William Herschel on October 26, 1786. Edward Swift, Lewis's son, found this galaxy again on 18 Jan 1890 while "searching for Swift's Comet." and it was reported as a new object in list IX-6.

== NGC 684 Group ==
NGC 684 is the largest member of a group of galaxies named after it (also known as LGG 32), which includes the galaxies NGC 670 and IC 1731.

== Supernovae ==
Two supernovae have been observed in NGC 684:

- SN 2021ass (Type II, mag. 18.1122) was discovered by the Zwicky Transient Facility on 18 January 2021.
- SN 2025aml (Type II, mag. 18.1168) was discovered by the Zwicky Transient Facility on 31 January 2025.

== See also ==
- Spiral galaxy
- List of NGC objects (1–1000)
- Triangulum (constellation)
