= NGC 420 =

Lenticular galaxy in the constellation of Pisces

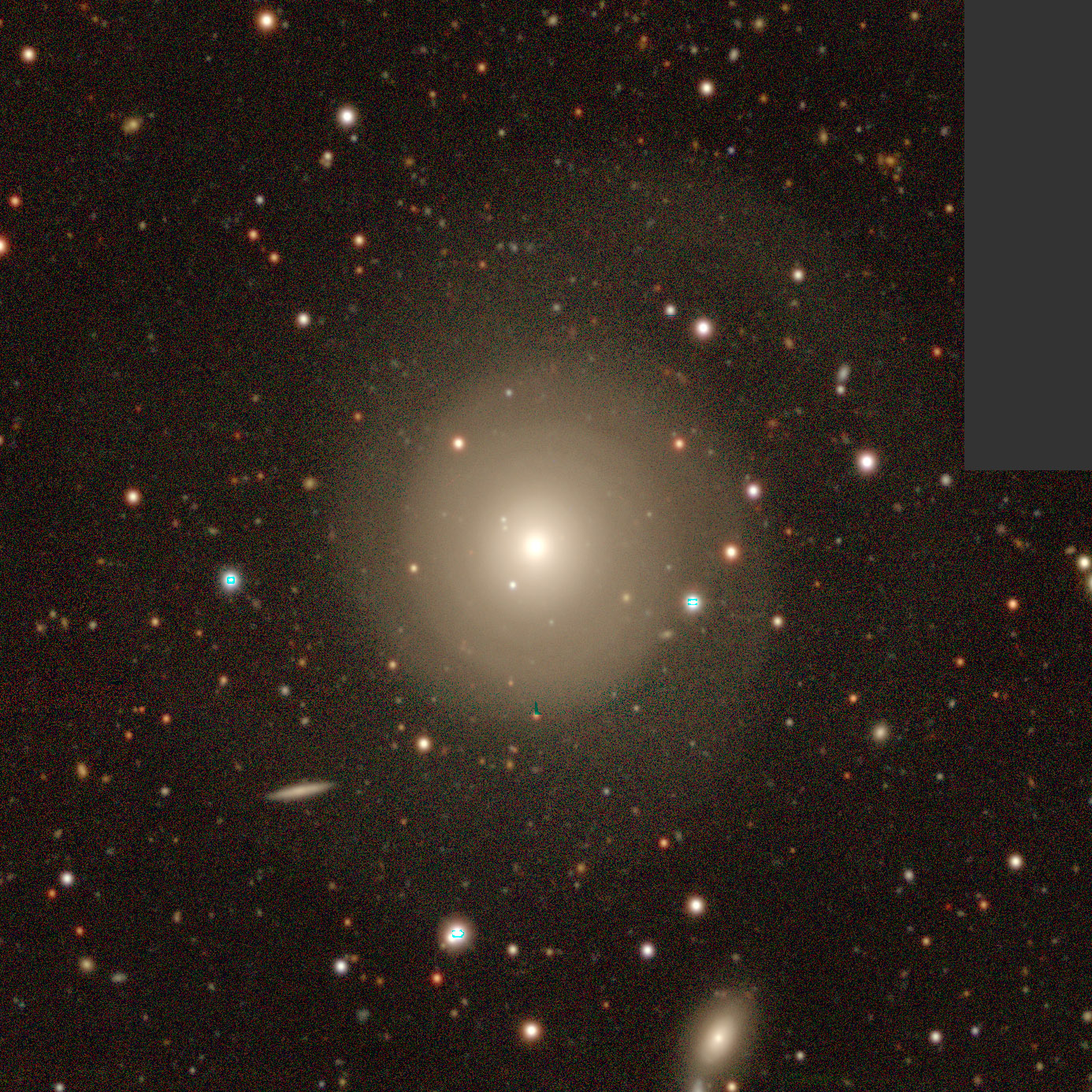
- DECam image of NGC 420

Observation data (J2000 epoch)
- Constellation: Pisces
- Right ascension: 01^{h} 12^{m} 09.6^{s}
- Declination: +32° 07′ 23″
- Redshift: 0.016712
- Heliocentric radial velocity: 5,010 km/s
- Distance: 207.87 ± 35.12 Mly (63.733 ± 10.768 Mpc)
- Apparent magnitude (V): 13.09
- Absolute magnitude (V): -22.73

Characteristics
- Type: S0
- Apparent size (V): 2.0' × 2.0'

Other designations
- UGC 00752, CGCG 501-127, CGCG 502-003, MCG +05-03-083, 2MASX J01120966+3207233, PGC 4320.

NGC 420 is a lenticular galaxy of type S0 located in the constellation Pisces. It was discovered on September 12, 1784 by William Herschel. It was described by Dreyer as "faint, pretty small, round, brighter middle."

NGC 420 is considered to be part of a galaxy group known as LGG 18 or NGC 452 Group. It has at least 17 members, which are NGC 383, NGC 385, NGC 399, NGC 403, NGC 382, NGC 443, NGC 444, NGC 392, NGC 452, NGC 374, NGC 388, NGC 410, NGC 414, IC 1654, IC 1618 and IC 1652.

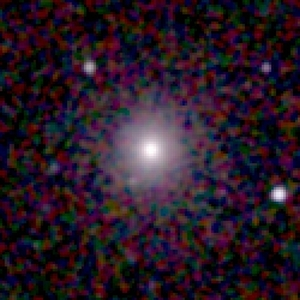
NGC 420 in near-infrared
