= NGC 452 =

Galaxy in the constellation Pisces

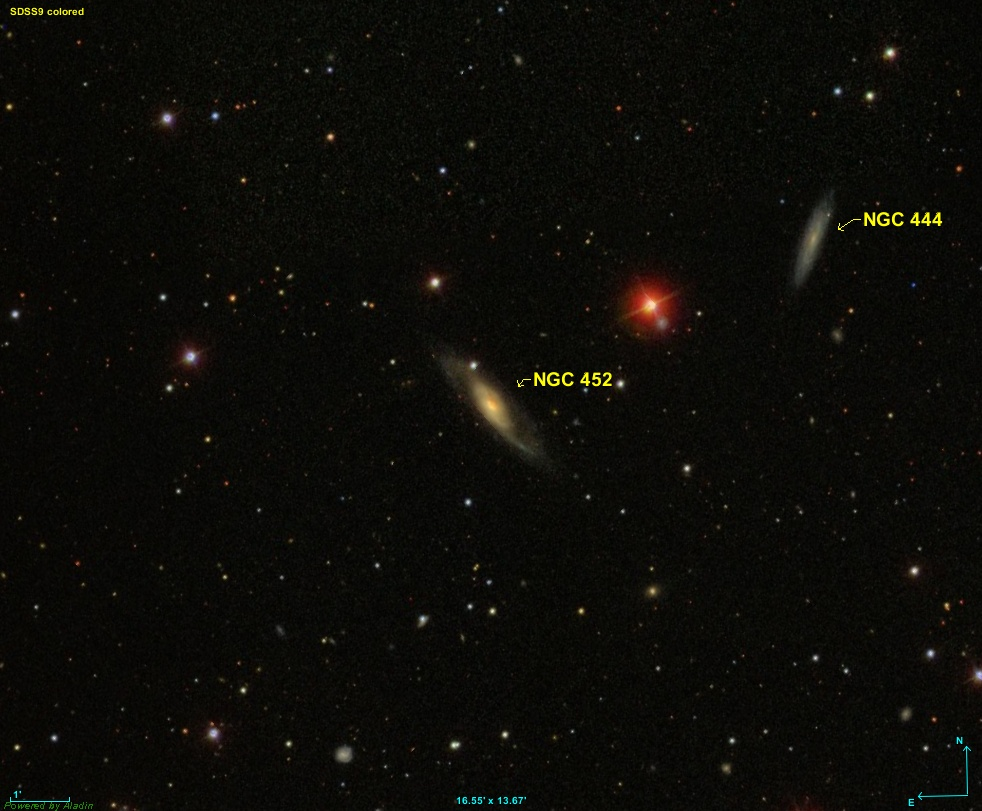
- NGC 452 seen from the SDSS, along with NGC 444.

Observation data (J2000 epoch)
- Constellation: Pisces
- Right ascension: 01^{h} 16^{m} 14.8^{s}
- Declination: +31° 02′ 02″
- Redshift: 0.016551
- Galactocentric velocity: 4962 km/s
- Apparent magnitude (V): 12.5

Characteristics
- Type: SBab

Other designations
- CGCG 502-20, IRAS 01134+3046, KCPG 28B, MGC 5-4-10, PGC 4596, UGC 820, V V 430

NGC 452 is a barred spiral galaxy located in the constellation Pisces. It was discovered in 1827 by Sir John Herschel. It is about 5 arcminutes west of NGC 444.

NGC 452 is considered to be part of a galaxy group known as LGG 18 or NGC 452 Group. It has at least 17 members, which are NGC 383, NGC 385, NGC 399, NGC 403, NGC 420, NGC 443, NGC 444, NGC 392, NGC 382, NGC 374, NGC 388, NGC 410, NGC 414, IC 1654, IC 1618 and IC 1652.

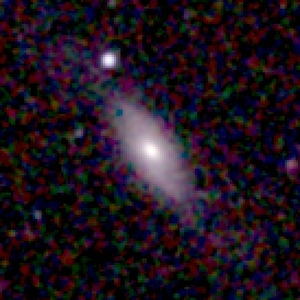
Image taken by 2MASS.
