= NGC 670 =

Galaxy in the constellation Triangulum

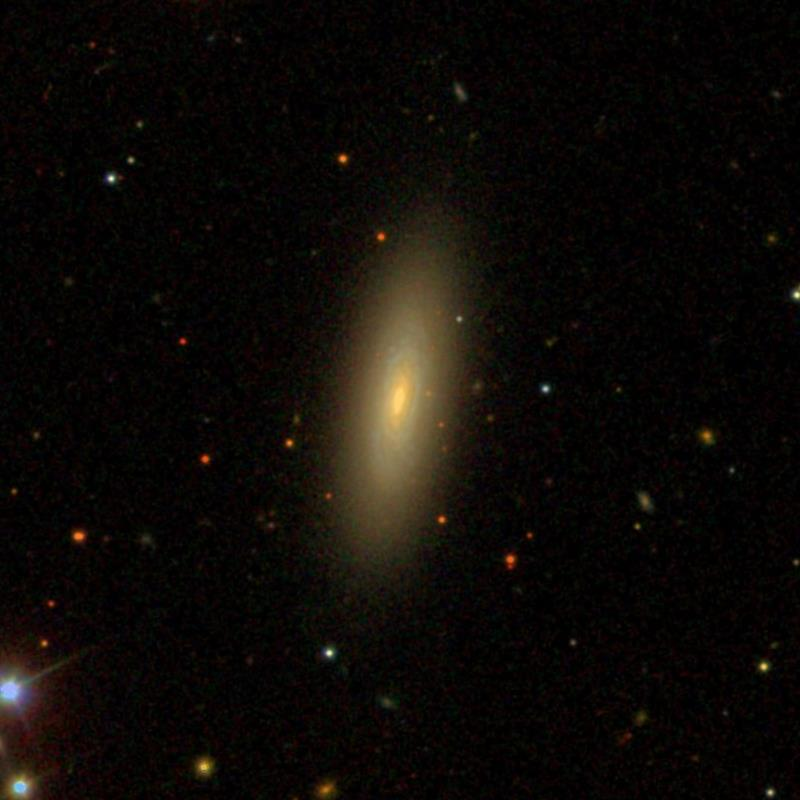
- SDSS image of NGC 670

Observation data (J2000 epoch)
- Constellation: Triangulum
- Right ascension: 01^{h} 47^{m} 24.846^{s}
- Declination: +27° 53′ 08.54″
- Redshift: 0.012429
- Heliocentric radial velocity: 3703 km/s
- Distance: 162.8 Mly (49.92 Mpc)
- Apparent magnitude (V): 12.72
- Apparent magnitude (B): 13.53

Characteristics
- Type: S0

Other designations
- UGC 1250, MCG +05-05-012, PGC 6570

NGC 670 is a lenticular galaxy located in the constellation Triangulum about 165 million light years from the Milky Way. It was discovered by the German-British astronomer William Herschel in 1786.

== LGG 32 Group ==
It is part of a galaxy group known as LGG 32. It has at least 3 members, which are NGC 684, IC 1731 and NGC 670.

== See also ==
- List of NGC objects (1–1000)
