= NGC 194 =

Elliptical galaxy in the constellation Pisces

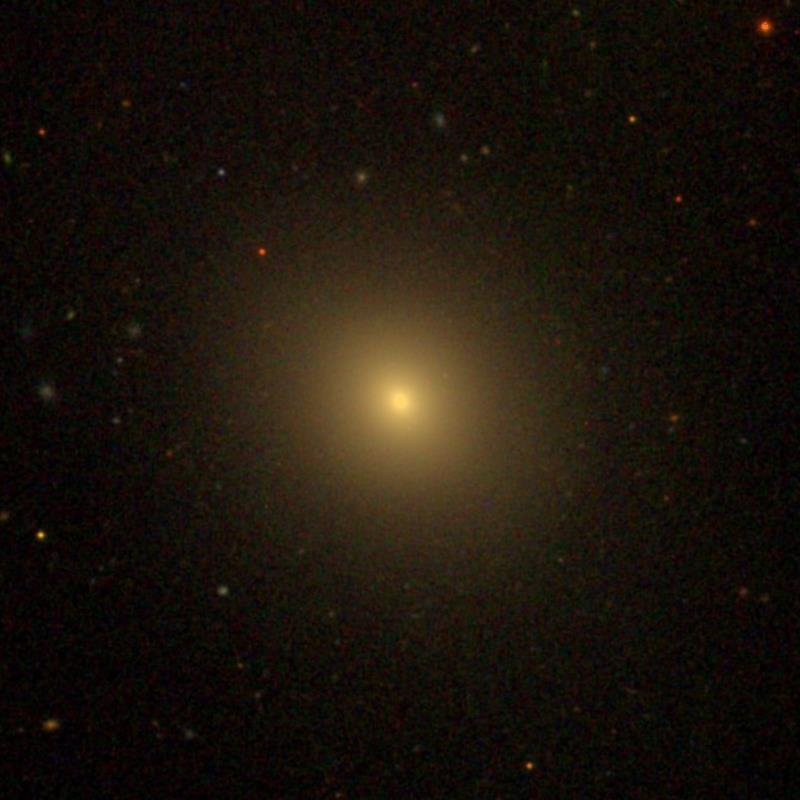
- SDSS image of NGC 194

Observation data (J2000 epoch)
- Constellation: Pisces
- Right ascension: 00^{h} 39^{m} 18.4^{s}
- Declination: +03° 02′ 15″
- Redshift: 0.017439
- Apparent magnitude (V): 13.15

Characteristics
- Type: E
- Apparent size (V): 1.5' × 1.4'

Other designations
- UGC 00407, CGCG 383-054, MCG +00-02-105, 2MASX J00391842+0302148, PGC 2362.

NGC 194 is an elliptical galaxy located in the constellation Pisces. It was discovered on December 25, 1790 by William Herschel.

NGC 194 is part of a galaxy group known as NGC 198 Group or LGG 9, together with NGC 182, NGC 198 and NGC 200.
