= NGC 97 =

Galaxy in the constellation Andromeda

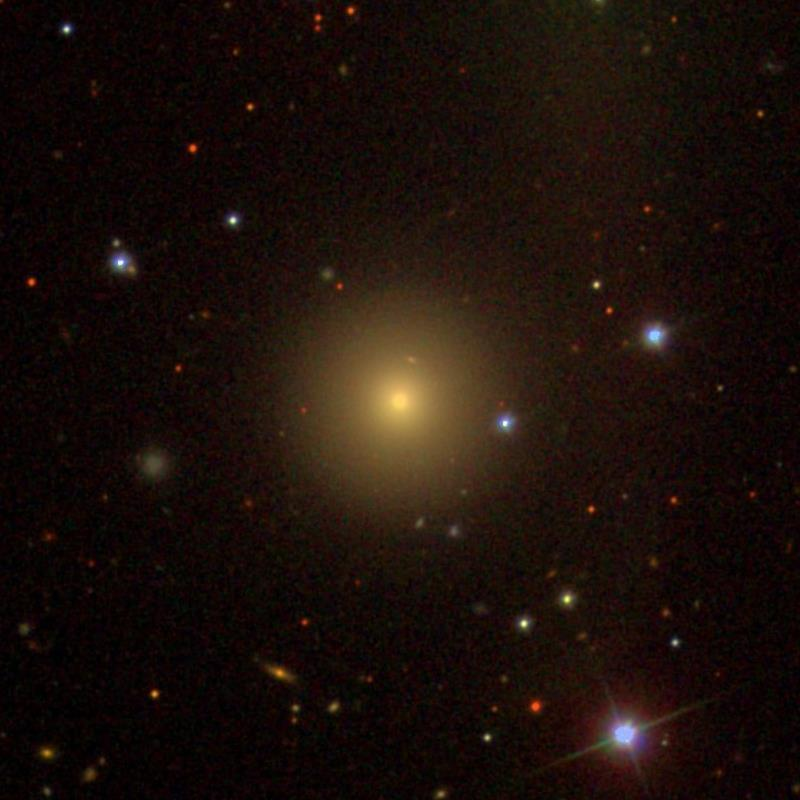
- SDSS image of NGC 97

Observation data (J2000 epoch)
- Constellation: Andromeda
- Right ascension: 00^{h} 22^{m} 29.988^{s}
- Declination: +29° 44′ 43.34″
- Redshift: 0.015898
- Heliocentric radial velocity: 4766
- Distance: 231.41 ± 13.61 Mly (70.950 ± 4.172 Mpc)
- Group or cluster: NGC 108 group (LGG 5)
- Apparent magnitude (B): 13.5

Characteristics
- Type: E?
- Size: 104,200 ly (31,960 pc)
- Apparent size (V): 1.548′ (major axis)

Other designations
- UGC 216, MCG+05-02-007, PGC 1442

NGC 97 is an elliptical galaxy estimated to be about 230 million light-years away in the constellation of Andromeda. It was discovered by John Herschel on 16 September 1828, and its apparent magnitude is 13.5.

== NGC 108 Group ==
NGC 97 is part of the NGC 108 group (also known as LGG 5), which includes at least 5 other galaxies: NGC 108, UGC 234, UGC 310, CGCG 500-015, and CGCG 500-019.

== Gallery ==
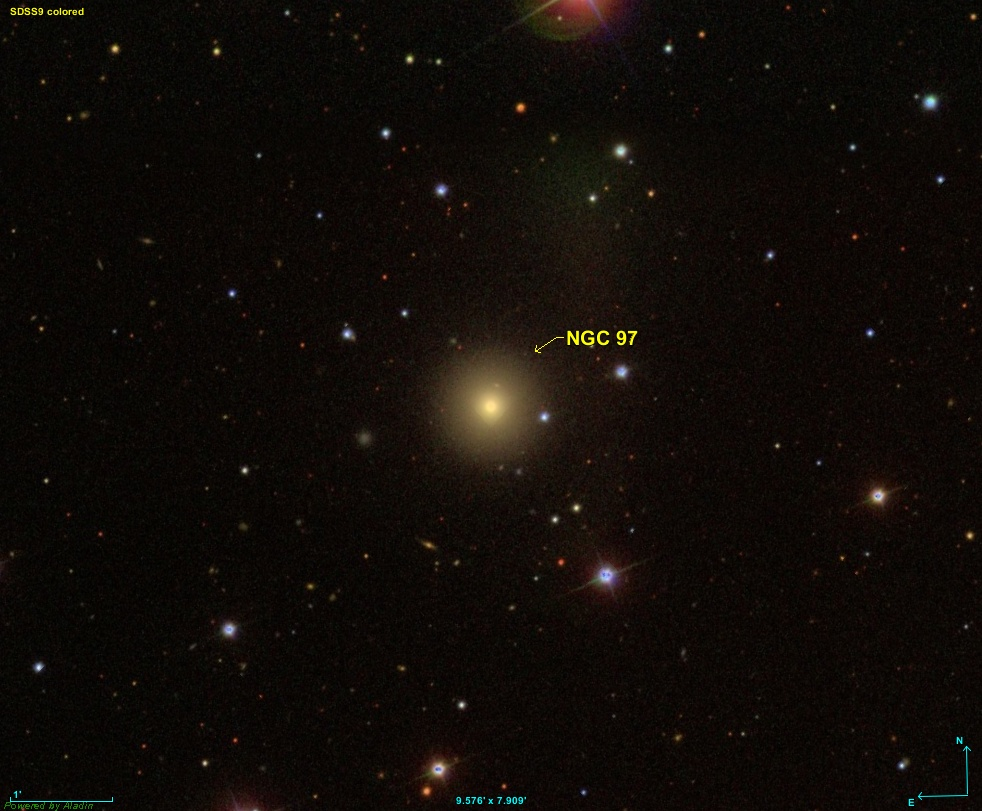
Wider view of NGC 97
