= NGC 108 =

Lenticular galaxy in the constellation Andromeda

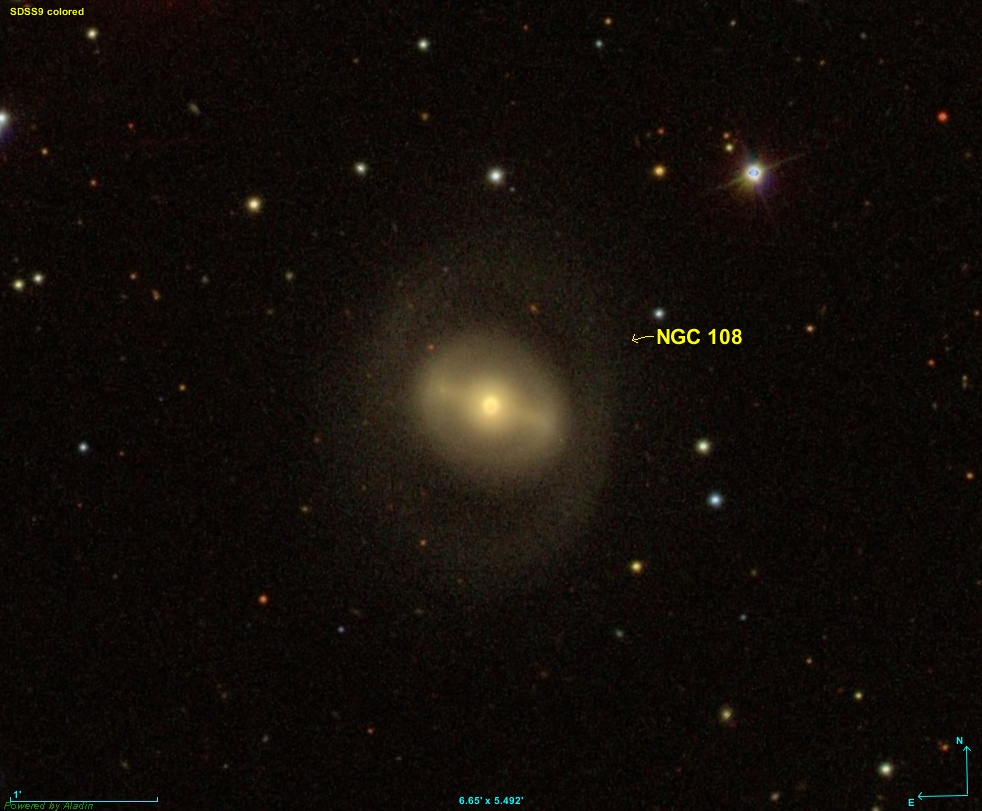
- NGC 108 imaged by SDSS

Observation data (J2000 epoch)
- Constellation: Andromeda
- Right ascension: 00^{h} 25^{m} 59.73^{s}
- Declination: 29° 12′ 43.4″
- Redshift: 0.015801
- Heliocentric radial velocity: 4737 km/s
- Distance: 220 Mly (67 Mpc)
- Group or cluster: NGC 108 group (LGG 5)
- Apparent magnitude (V): 12.1

Characteristics
- Type: (R)SB0^{+}(r)
- Apparent size (V): 2.7′ × 1.9′

Other designations
- UGC 246, MCG +05-02-012, PGC 1619

NGC 108 is a barred lenticular galaxy that is located at approximately 220 million light-years away in the constellation of Andromeda. It was discovered by German-British astronomer William Herschel on September 11, 1784.

== NGC 108 Group ==
NGC 108 is the namesake of the NGC 108 group (also known as LGG 5), which includes at least 5 other galaxies: NGC 97, UGC 234, UGC 310, CGCG 500-015, and CGCG 500-019.
