= NGC 1153 =

Lenticular galaxy in the constellation Cetus

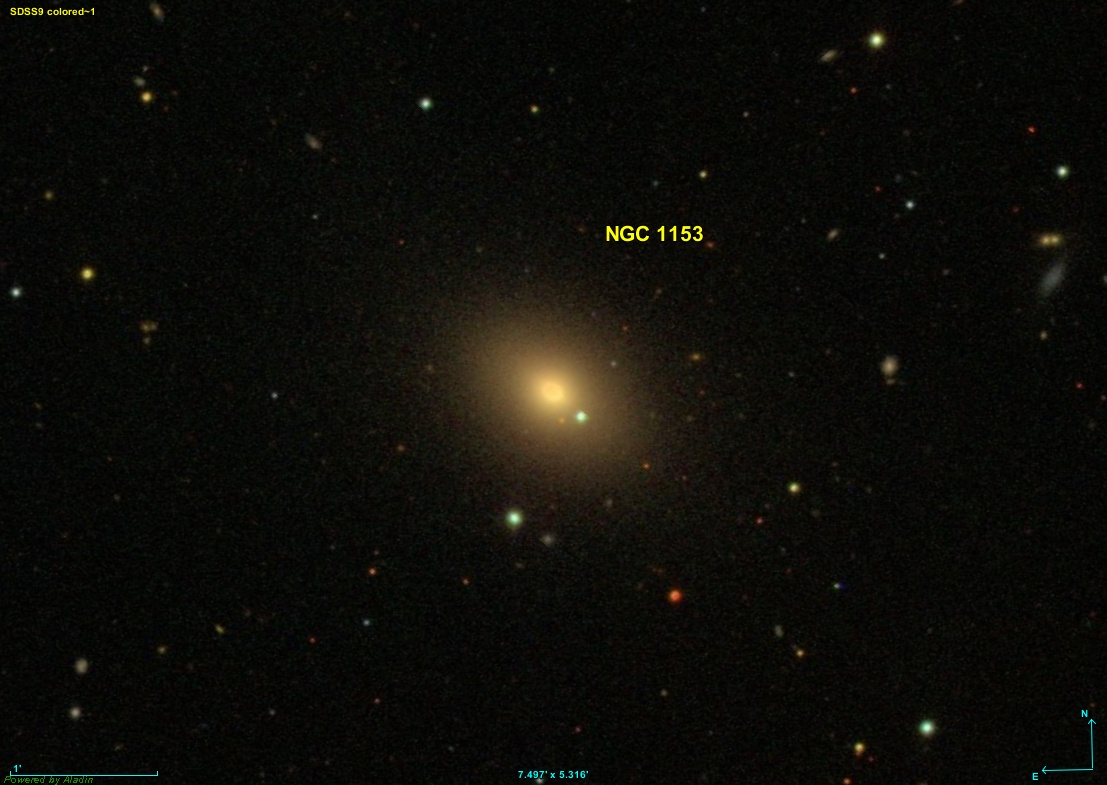

Observation data (J2000 epoch)
- Constellation: Cetus
- Right ascension: 02^{h} 58^{m} 10.28^{s}
- Declination: +03° 21′ 42.90″
- Redshift: 0.010454
- Heliocentric radial velocity: 3118 km/s
- Distance: 44 Mpc (144 million light-years)
- Apparent magnitude (V): 12.4 (V)
- Surface brightness: 22.8 mag/arcsec²

Characteristics
- Type: S0-a (Lenticular)
- Size: 1.23′ × 0.85′

Other designations
- PGC 11230, UGC 2439, MCG 0-8-59, CGCG 389-55

NGC 1153 is a lenticular galaxy located in the constellation Cetus. It was discovered by Lewis Swift on December 30, 1880. The galaxy is cataloged as type S0-a, indicating a lenticular morphology, which lies between spiral and elliptical galaxies.

It is part of galaxy group known as LGG 79. LGG 79 consists of at least 5 galaxies, which are NGC 1137, IC 277, IC 273 and UGC 244.

== Characteristics ==
NGC 1153 has an apparent magnitude of 12.4 in the visual band and 13.3 in the blue band. Its dimensions are approximately 1.23 arcminutes by 0.85 arcminutes. The galaxy's redshift of 0.010454 indicates it is receding from the Earth at a velocity of about 3118 km/s, placing it roughly 144 million light-years (44 megaparsecs) away from the Milky Way.

== Observations ==
NGC 1153 can be observed in the constellation Cetus, which is known for its numerous deep-sky objects. The surface brightness of NGC 1153 is relatively low, making it more challenging to observe without advanced equipment. It is part of the New General Catalogue (NGC) and has alternate designations such as PGC 11230 and UGC 2439.
