= NGC 5374 =

Galaxy in the constellation Virgo

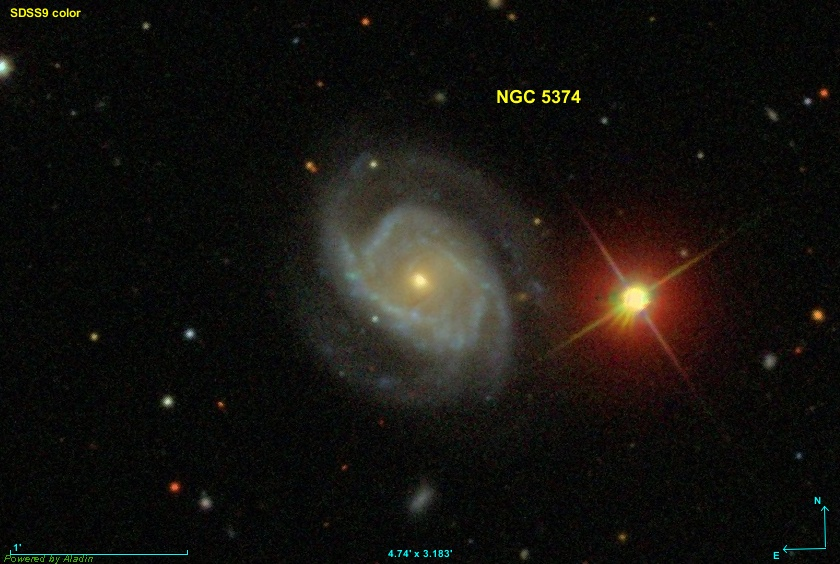
- NGC 5374 imaged by SDSS

Observation data (J2000 epoch)
- Constellation: Virgo
- Right ascension: 13^{h} 57^{m} 29.6454^{s}
- Declination: +06° 05′ 49.342″
- Redshift: 0.014483±0.00000787
- Heliocentric radial velocity: 4,342±2 km/s
- Distance: 224.16 ± 13.31 Mly (68.729 ± 4.081 Mpc)
- Group or cluster: NGC 5374 group (LGG 368)
- Apparent magnitude (V): 13.27

Characteristics
- Type: SB(r)bc
- Size: ~113,900 ly (34.92 kpc) (estimated)
- Apparent size (V): 1.7′ × 1.5′

Other designations
- IRAS 13549+0620, UGC 8874, MCG +01-36-004, PGC 49650, CGCG 046-016

NGC 5374 is a barred spiral galaxy in the constellation of Virgo. Its velocity with respect to the cosmic microwave background is 4,612±19 km/s, which corresponds to a Hubble distance of 221.9 ± 15.6 Mly (68.02 ± 4.77 Mpc). Additionally, seven non-redshift measurements give a similar mean distance of 224.16 ± 13.31 Mly (68.729 ± 4.081 Mpc). It was discovered by German-British astronomer William Herschel on 12 May 1793.

NGC 5374 is a radio galaxy, i.e. it has giant regions of radio emission extending well beyond its visible structure.

== NGC 5374 group ==
According to A. M. Garcia, NGC 5374 is the namesake of a group of galaxies. The NGC 5374 group (also known as LGG 368) contains at least eight galaxies, including NGC 5382, NGC 5384, NGC 5386, NGC 5417, NGC 5418, NGC 5434, and UGC 8906.

== Supernovae ==
Three supernovae have been observed in NGC 5374:

- SN 2003bl (Type II, mag. 18.4) was discovered by LOTOSS (Lick Observatory and Tenagra Observatory Supernova Searches) on 2 March 2003.
- SN 2010do (Type Ic, mag. 17.2) was discovered by Berto Monard on 2 June 2010.
- SN 2016P (Type Ic-BL, mag. 16) was discovered by Grzegorz Duszanowicz and Michal Zolnowski on 19 January 2016.

== See also ==
- List of NGC objects (5001–6000)
