= NGC 822 =

Galaxy in the constellation Phoenix

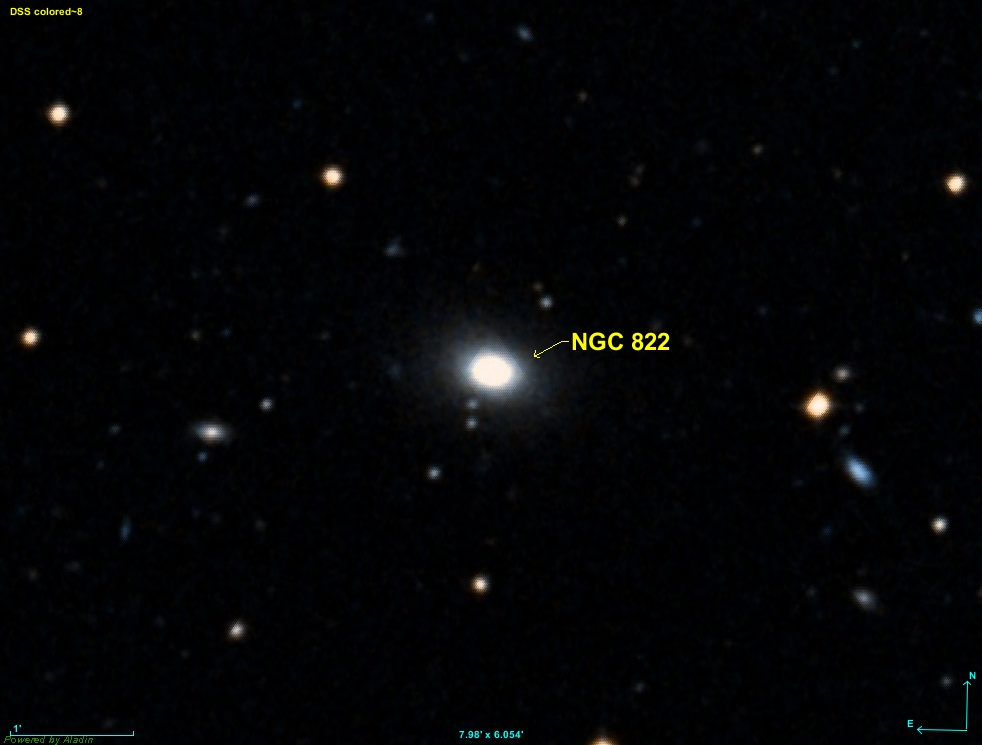
- DSS image of NGC 822

Observation data (J2000 epoch)
- Constellation: Phoenix
- Right ascension: 02^{h} 06^{m} 39.13396^{s}
- Declination: −41° 09′ 24.2724″
- Redshift: 0.017856
- Heliocentric radial velocity: 5305 km/s
- Distance: 233.3 Mly (71.52 Mpc)
- Apparent magnitude (B): 14.25

Characteristics
- Type: E

Other designations
- MCG -07-05-008, PGC 8055

NGC 822 is an elliptical galaxy in the constellation Phoenix. It is estimated to be about 233 million light-years from the Milky Way and has a diameter of approximately 80,000 light-years. NGC 822 was discovered on September 5, 1834, by astronomer John Herschel.

NGC 822 is a member of the NGC 822 group (also known as LGG 50), which contains three galaxies, including NGC 862 and ESO 298-8.

== See also ==
- List of NGC objects (1–1000)
