= NGC 182 =

Spiral galaxy in the constellation Pisces

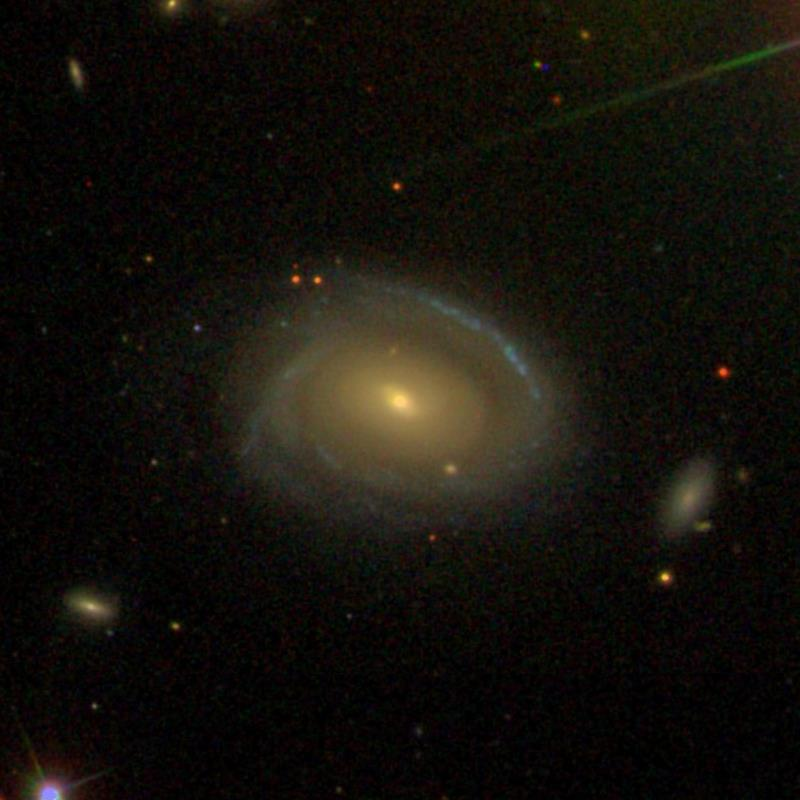
- NGC 182 as seen on SDSS

Observation data (J2000 epoch)
- Constellation: Pisces
- Right ascension: 00^{h} 38^{m} 12.4^{s}
- Declination: +02° 43′ 43″
- Redshift: 0.017549
- Distance: 286.69 ± 33.03 Mly (87.900 ± 10.128 Mpc)
- Apparent magnitude (V): 13.27

Characteristics
- Type: (R')SAB(rs)a
- Apparent size (V): 2.0' × 1.7'

Other designations
- UGC 382, CGCG 383-045, MCG +00-02-095, 2MASX J00381239+0243428, PGC 2279.

NGC 182 is a spiral galaxy with a ring structure, located in the constellation Pisces. Astronomer William Herschel discovered it on December 25, 1790.

A Type IIb supernova, designated SN 2004ex, was discovered in this galaxy in 2004.

NGC 182 is located in a galaxy group known as NGC 198 Group or LGG 9, together with NGC 198, NGC 194 and NGC 200.
