= IRAS 18162−2048 =

Protostar in the constellation Sagittarius

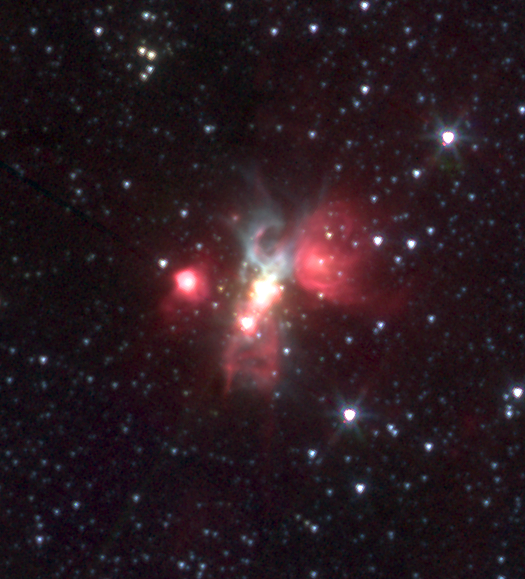
- Mid-infrared image of IRAS 18162-2048

Observation data Epoch J2000.0 Equinox ICRS
- Constellation: Sagittarius
- Right ascension: 18^{h} 19^{m} 11.8^{s}
- Declination: −20° 47′ 35″

Astrometry
Distance	~1700 pc

Details
Mass	~10 M_{☉}
Luminosity	~17,000 L_{☉}

Other designations
- HH 80-81 IRS

Database references
SIMBAD	data

IRAS 18162-2048 is a far-infrared source discovered by IRAS spacecraft in 1983. It is associated with a large (~10 solar masses) protostar, which accretes gas from a disk that surrounds it. IRAS 18162-2048 emits two collimated radio jets along its axis of rotation. The jets are made of chains of radio sources aligned in a southwest–northeast direction. The northern jet terminates in Herbig–Haro object HH 81N, while the southern one terminates in Herbig–Haro objects HH 80 and HH 81. Its total luminosity is about 17,000 solar luminosities. The total extent of this system of jets and radio sources is about 5 pc.

In 2010 HH 80–81 jet was found to emit polarized radio waves, which indicated that they were produced by relativistic electrons moving along the magnetic field estimated at 20 nT. This observation was the first of its kind to demonstrate that a protostar can have a magnetized jet.

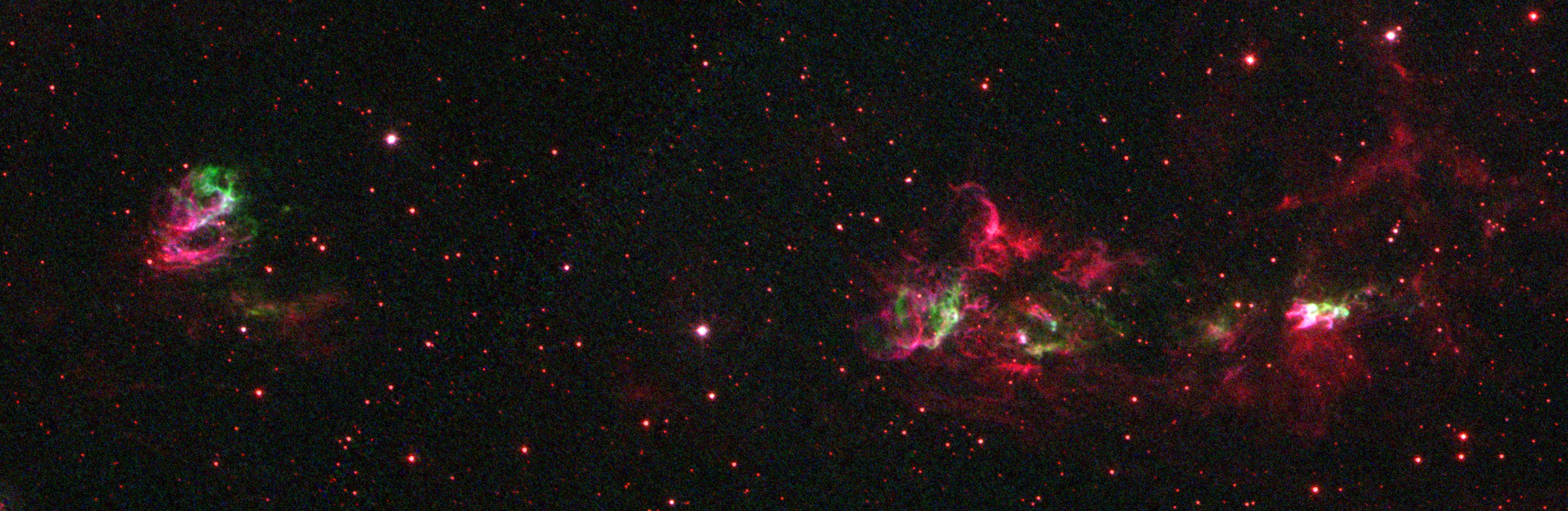
Hubble narrow-band image of HH 80
