= NGC 382 =

Elliptical galaxy in the constellation Pisces

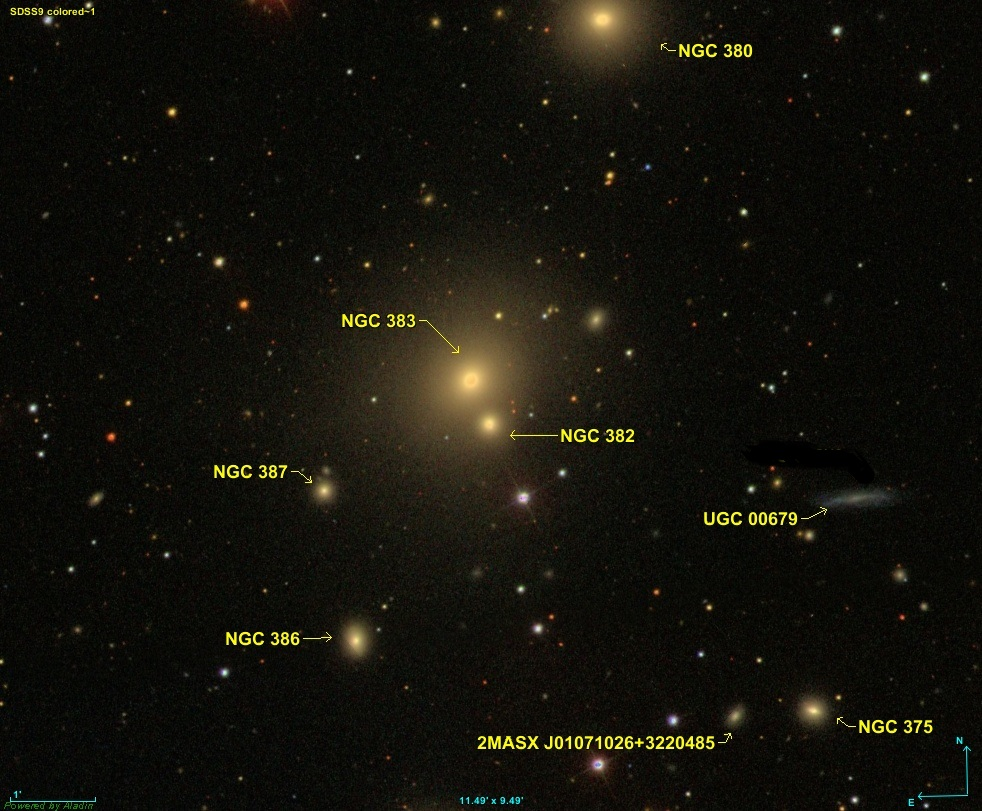
- SDSS image of NGC 382

Observation data (J2000 epoch)
- Constellation: Pisces
- Right ascension: 01^{h} 07^{m} 24.08^{s}
- Declination: +32° 24′ 14.2″
- Redshift: 0.01749
- Heliocentric radial velocity: 5196 km/s
- Distance: 214.5 Mly (65.77 Mpc)
- Apparent magnitude (B): 14.48

Characteristics
- Type: E

Other designations
- UGC 688, MCG +05-03-052, PGC 3981, CGCG 501-086, VV 193b

NGC 382 is an elliptical galaxy located in the constellation Pisces. Its discovery (on 4 November 1850) has been credited to William Parsons.

== Supernova ==
One supernova has been observed in NGC 382: SN 2000dk (Type Ia, mag. 16.0) was discovered by the Lick Observatory Supernova Search (LOSS) on 18 September 2000.

== Group of galaxies ==
NGC 382 is in a group of galaxies with galaxies NGC 375, NGC 379, NGC 380, NGC 383, NGC 384, NGC 385, NGC 386, NGC 387 and NGC 388, which is listed in the Atlas of Peculiar Galaxies as Arp 331.

NGC 382 is considered to be part of a galaxy group known as LGG 18 or NGC 452 Group. It has at least 17 members, which are NGC 383, NGC 385, NGC 399, NGC 403, NGC 420, NGC 443, NGC 444, NGC 392, NGC 452, NGC 374, NGC 388, NGC 410, NGC 414, IC 1654, IC 1618 and IC 1652.

== See also ==
- List of NGC objects (1–1000)
