= NGC 200 =

Galaxy in the constellation Pisces

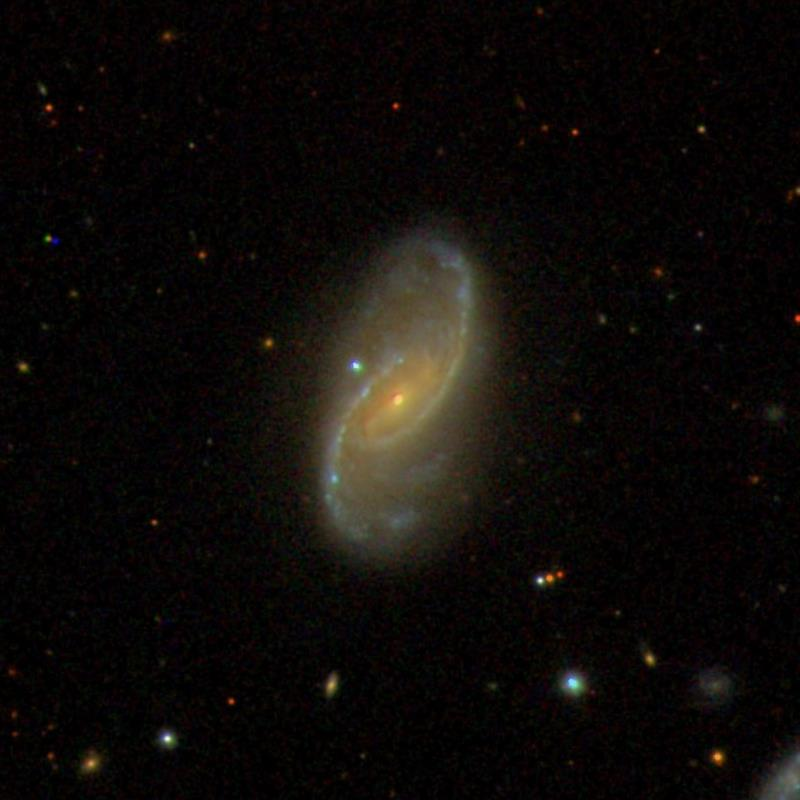
- SDSS image of NGC 200

Observation data (J2000 epoch)
- Constellation: Pisces
- Right ascension: 00^{h} 39^{m} 34.9^{s}
- Declination: +02° 53′ 15″
- Redshift: 0.017242
- Apparent magnitude (V): 13.48

Characteristics
- Type: SBc
- Apparent size (V): 1.9' × 1.0'

Other designations
- UGC 00420, CGCG 383-060, MCG +00-02-112, 2MASX J00393486+0253145, IRAS 00370+0236, F00370+0236, PGC 2387.

NGC 200 is a spiral galaxy located in the constellation Pisces. It was discovered on December 25, 1790 by William Herschel.

NGC 200 is part of a galaxy group known as NGC 198 Group or LGG 9, together with NGC 182, NGC 194 and NGC 198.

== See also ==
- Spiral galaxy
- List of NGC objects (1–1000)
- Pisces (constellation)
