= NGC 151 =

Galaxy in the constellation Cetus

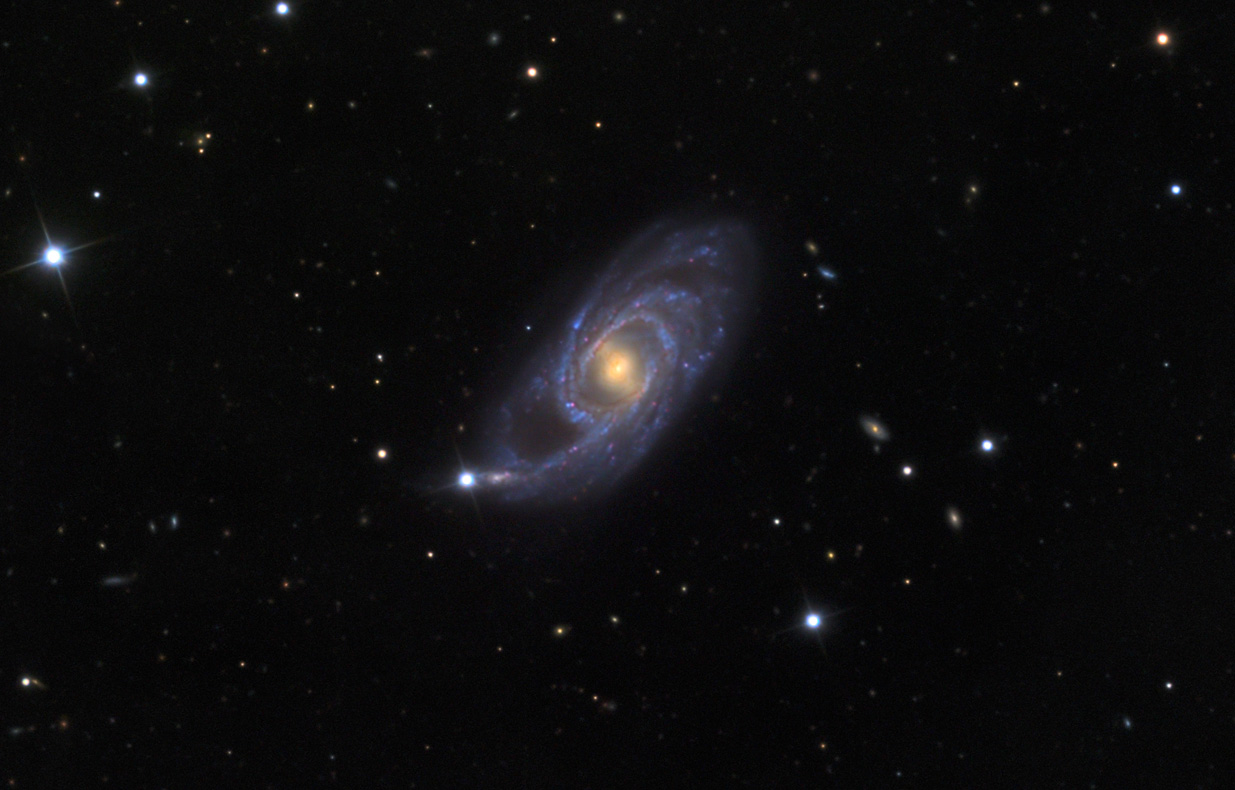
- NGC 151 imaged by the Mount Lemmon Observatory SkyCenter using the 0.8m Schulman Telescope

Observation data (J2000 epoch)
- Constellation: Cetus
- Right ascension: 00^{h} 34^{m} 02.79176^{s}
- Declination: −09° 42′ 18.9821″
- Redshift: 0.012562
- Heliocentric radial velocity: 3742.3 km/s
- Distance: 170 Mly (52 Mpc)
- Apparent magnitude (V): 11.59
- Apparent magnitude (B): 12.31

Characteristics
- Type: SB(r)bc
- Size: 3.7′ × 1.7′

Other designations
- NGC 153, MCG -02-02-054, PGC 2035

NGC 151 is a mid-sized barred spiral galaxy located in the constellation Cetus.

The galaxy was discovered by English astronomer William Herschel on November 28, 1785. In 1886, Lewis Swift observed the same galaxy and catalogued it as NGC 153, only for it later to be identified as NGC 151.

The galaxy, viewed from almost face on, has several bright, blue, dusty spiral arms filled with active star formation. One noticeable feature of the galaxy is a large gap between the spiral arms.

NGC 151 is located in a galaxy group known as LGG 8, together with NGC 217, MCG 2-2-30 and MCG 2-2-38.

== Supernovae ==
Two supernovae have been observed in NGC 151:

- PTF11iqb (Type IIn, mag. 17.1) was discovered by the Palomar Transient Factory on 22 July 2011.
- SN 2023lnh (Type Ia, mag. 18) was discovered by ATLAS on 24 June 2023.

== See also ==
- List of NGC objects (1–1000)
