= NGC 385 =

Galaxy in the constellation Pisces

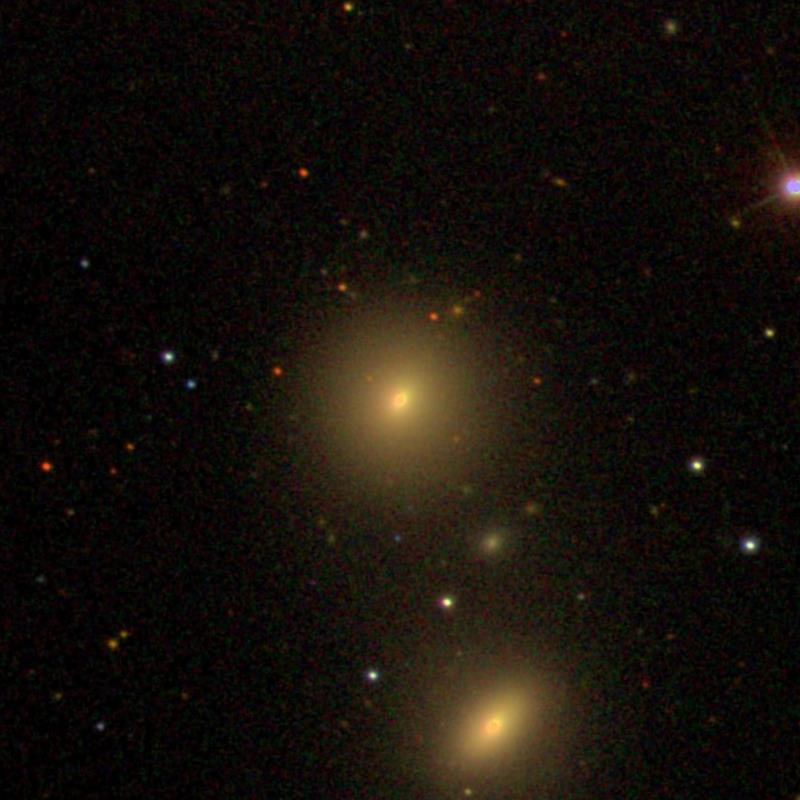
- SDSS image of NGC 385 (NGC 384 is in the bottom center)

Observation data (J2000 epoch)
- Constellation: Pisces
- Right ascension: 01^{h} 07^{m} 27.2^{s}
- Declination: +32° 19′ 10″
- Redshift: 0.016595
- Heliocentric radial velocity: 4,975 km/s
- Apparent magnitude (V): 13.93

Characteristics
- Type: SA0^{−}:
- Apparent size (V): 1.1' × 1.0'

Other designations
- UGC 00687, CGCG 501-085, MCG +05-03-056, 2MASX J01072723+3219112, 2MASXi J0107272+321911, PGC 3984.

NGC 385 is an unbarred lenticular galaxy located in the constellation Pisces. It was discovered on November 4, 1850, by Bindon Stoney. It was described by Dreyer as "pretty faint, pretty small, round, northeastern of 2.", the other being NGC 384. Along with galaxies NGC 375, NGC 379, NGC 382, NGC 383, NGC 384, NGC 386, NGC 387 and NGC 388, NGC 385 forms a galaxy cluster called Arp 331.

NGC 385 is considered to be part of a galaxy group known as LGG 18 or NGC 452 Group. It has at least 17 members, which are NGC 383, NGC 382, NGC 399, NGC 403, NGC 420, NGC 443, NGC 444, NGC 392, NGC 452, NGC 374, NGC 388, NGC 410, NGC 414, IC 1654, IC 1618 and IC 1652.
