= NGC 198 =

Spiral galaxy in the constellation Pisces

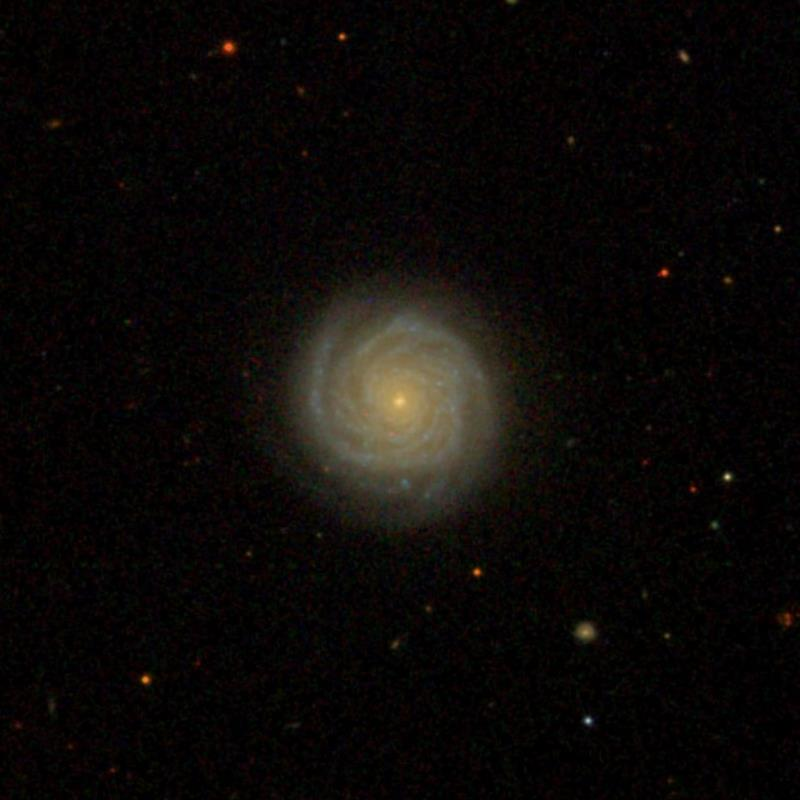
- SDSS image of NGC 198

Observation data (J2000 epoch)
- Constellation: Pisces
- Right ascension: 00^{h} 39^{m} 23.0^{s}
- Declination: +02° 47′ 53″
- Redshift: 0.017596
- Apparent magnitude (V): 13.85

Characteristics
- Type: SA(r)c
- Apparent size (V): 1.2' × 1.2'

Other designations
- UGC 414, CGCG 383-057, MCG +00-02-107, 2MASX J00392298+0247525, IRAS 00367+0231, F00368+0231, PGC 2371.

NGC 198 is a spiral galaxy located in the constellation Pisces. It was discovered on December 25, 1790 by William Herschel.

One supernova has been observed in NGC 198: SN 2021adxd (Type II-P, mag. 19.8) was discovered by the Zwicky Transient Facility on 6 November 2021.

NGC 198 is part of a galaxy group known as LGG 9, together with NGC 182, NGC 194 and NGC 200.

== See also ==
- Spiral galaxy
- List of NGC objects (1–1000)
- Pisces (constellation)
