= NGC 403 =

Lenticular galaxy in the constellation Pisces

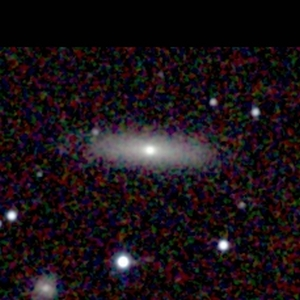
- NGC 403 as seen by 2MASS

Observation data (J2000 epoch)
- Constellation: Pisces
- Right ascension: 01^{h} 09^{m} 14.1^{s}
- Declination: +32° 45′ 08″
- Redshift: 0.016978
- Heliocentric radial velocity: 5,090 km/s
- Distance: 216.9 million ly (65.5 mpc)
- Apparent magnitude (V): 12.5

Characteristics
- Type: S0/a
- Apparent size (V): 1.8' × 0.6'

Other designations
- CGCG 501-104, MCG +05-03-068, PGC 4111, UGC 715

NGC 403 is a lenticular galaxy located in the constellation of Pisces. It was discovered on August 29, 1862, by Heinrich d'Arrest.

NGC 403 is considered to be part of a galaxy group known as LGG 18 or NGC 452 Group. It has at least 17 members, which are NGC 383, NGC 385, NGC 399, NGC 382, NGC 420, NGC 443, NGC 444, NGC 392, NGC 452, NGC 374, NGC 388, NGC 410, NGC 414, IC 1654, IC 1618 and IC 1652.

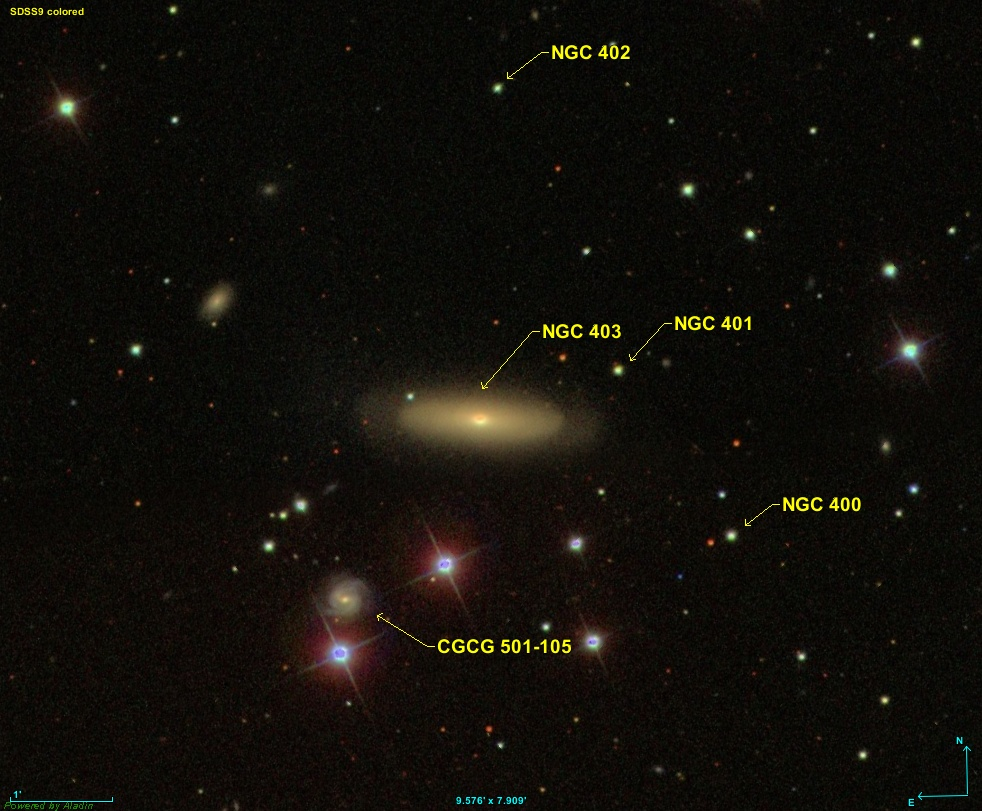
NGC 403 (SDSS)

== See also ==
- Lenticular galaxy
- List of NGC objects (1–1000)
- Pisces (constellation)
