= NGC 260 =

Galaxy in the constellation Andromeda

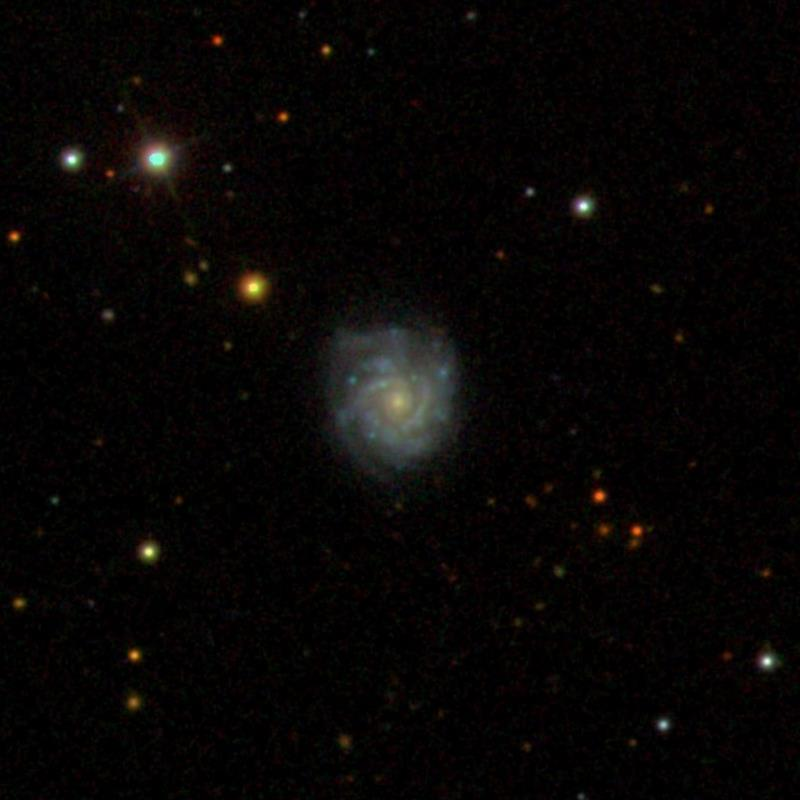
- SDSS image of NGC 260

Observation data (J2000 epoch)
- Constellation: Andromeda
- Right ascension: 00^{h} 48^{m} 34.6^{s}
- Declination: +27° 41′ 33″
- Redshift: 0.017385
- Apparent magnitude (V): 14.23

Characteristics
- Type: Scd
- Apparent size (V): 0.9' × 0.9'

Other designations
- UGC 00497, CGCG 480-009, MCG +04-03-006, 2MASX J00483464+2741329, 2MASXi J0048346+274133, IRAS 00458+2725, F00458+2725, PGC 2844.

NGC 260 is a spiral galaxy located in the constellation Andromeda. It was discovered on August 27, 1865 by Heinrich d'Arrest.

It is part of a galaxy group known as LGG 12, which has 5 core members, which are NGC 252, UGC 470, UGC 501 and CGCG 500-92
