= NGC 444 =

Spiral galaxy in the constellation Pisces

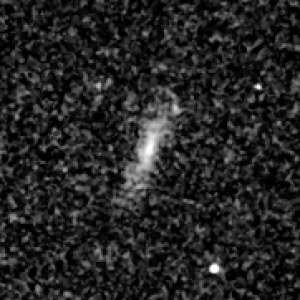
- NGC 444 as seen by 2MASS

Observation data (J2000 epoch)
- Constellation: Pisces
- Right ascension: 01^{h} 15^{m} 49.6^{s}
- Declination: +31° 04′ 49″
- Redshift: 0.016141
- Heliocentric radial velocity: 4,839 km/s
- Distance: 172.16 ± 23.24 Mly (52.785 ± 7.126 Mpc)
- Apparent magnitude (V): 15.02
- Absolute magnitude (V): -21.11

Characteristics
- Type: Sd
- Apparent size (V): 1.9' × 0.4'

Other designations
- UGC 810, CGCG 502-015, MCG +05-04-007, 2MASX J01154958+3104488, 2MASXi J0115495+310448, PGC 4561, IC 1658.

NGC 444 is a spiral galaxy of type Sd located in the constellation Pisces. It was first discovered on October 26, 1854 by R. J. Mitchell (and later listed as NGC 444), and was also spotted on October 17, 1903 by Stéphane Javelle (and later listed as IC 1658). It was described by Dreyer as "very faint, much extended 135°, a little brighter middle."

NGC 444 is considered to be part of a galaxy group known as LGG 18 or NGC 452 Group. It has at least 17 members, which are NGC 383, NGC 385, NGC 399, NGC 403, NGC 420, NGC 443, NGC 382, NGC 392, NGC 452, NGC 374, NGC 388, NGC 410, NGC 414, IC 1654, IC 1618 and IC 1652.

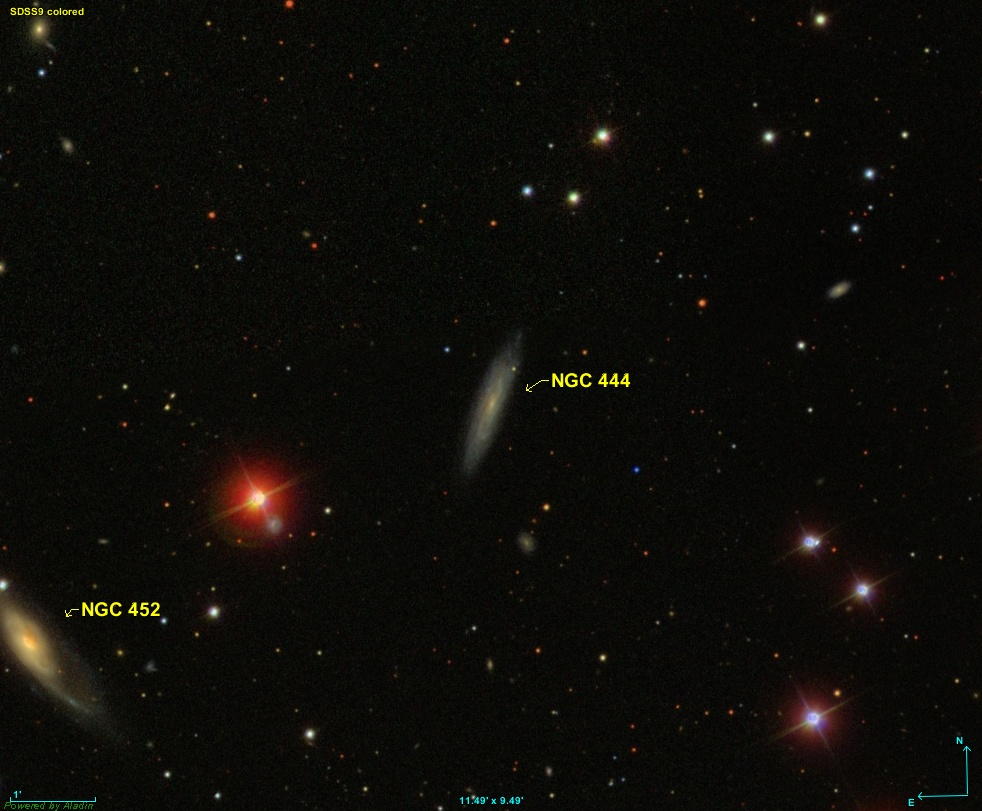
Image taken by SDSS.
