= NGC 443 =

Galaxy in the constellation Pisces

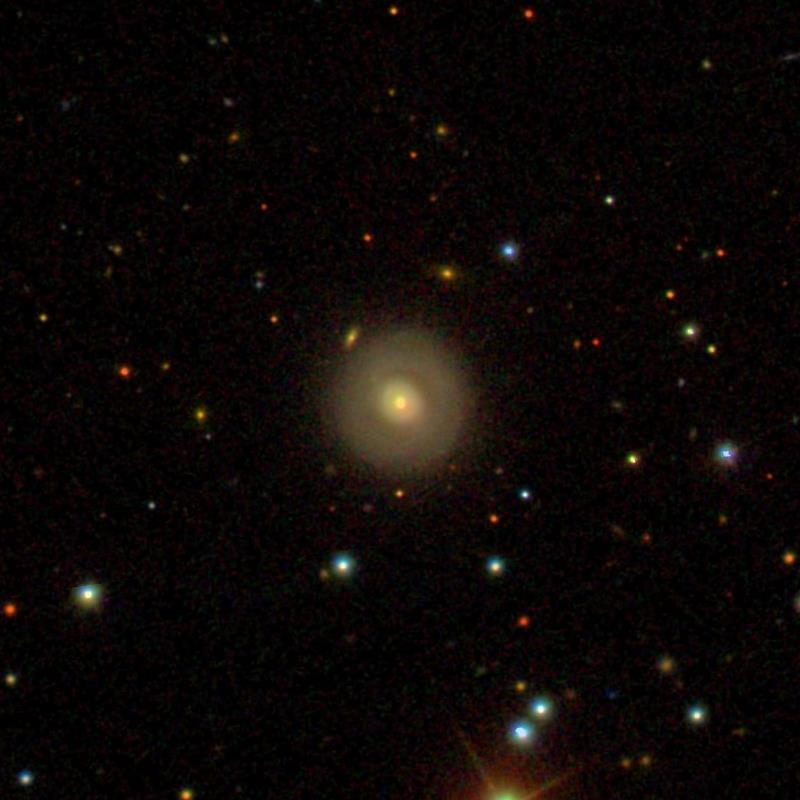
- SDSS view of NGC 443

Observation data (J2000 epoch)
- Constellation: Pisces
- Right ascension: 01^{h} 15^{m} 07.6^{s}
- Declination: +33° 22′ 38″
- Redshift: 0.015961
- Heliocentric radial velocity: 4,785 km/s
- Apparent magnitude (V): 14.01
- Absolute magnitude (V): -20.22

Characteristics
- Type: S0/(r)a?
- Apparent size (V): 0.8' × 0.7'

Other designations
- UGC 00796, CGCG 502-010, MCG +05-04-005, 2MASX J01150761+3322385, 2MASXi J0115076+332238, PGC 4512, IC 1653.

NGC 443 is a lenticular galaxy of type S0/(r)a? located in the constellation Pisces. It was first discovered on October 8, 1861 by Heinrich d'Arrest (and later listed as NGC 443), and was also spotted on October 17, 1903 by Stéphane Javelle (and later listed as IC 1653). It was described by Dreyer as "faint, small, round, 15th magnitude star 8 seconds of time to west on parallel (that is, at the same declination)."

NGC 443 is considered to be part of a galaxy group known as LGG 18 or NGC 452 Group. It has at least 17 members, which are NGC 383, NGC 385, NGC 399, NGC 403, NGC 420, NGC 382, NGC 444, NGC 392, NGC 452, NGC 374, NGC 388, NGC 410, NGC 414, IC 1654, IC 1618 and IC 1652.
