= NGC 407 =

Galaxy in the constellation Pisces

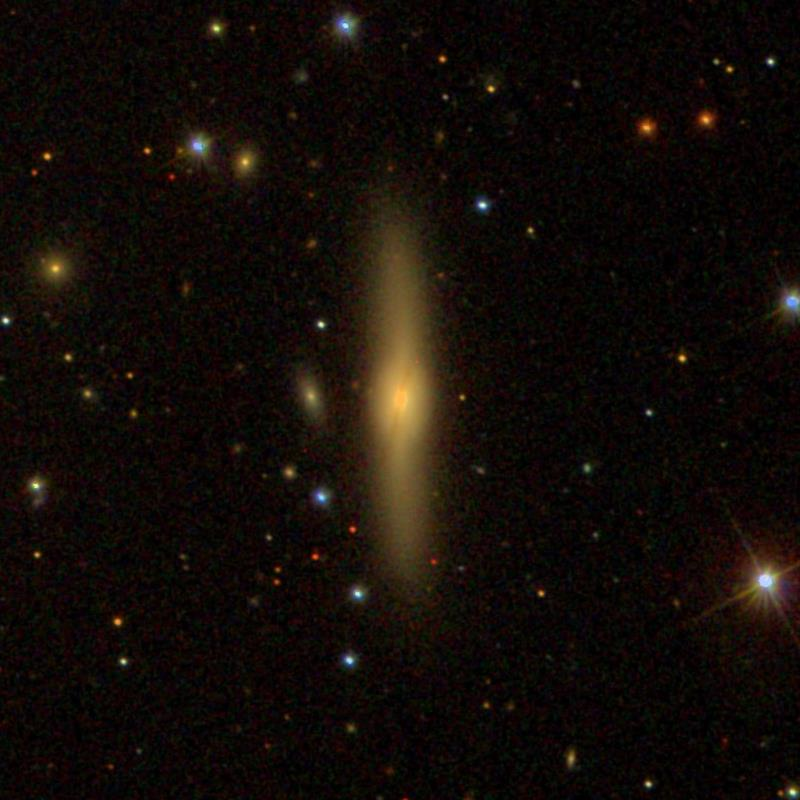
- SDSS image of NGC 407

Observation data (J2000 epoch)
- Constellation: Pisces
- Right ascension: 01^{h} 10^{m} 36.5^{s}
- Declination: +33° 07′ 35″
- Redshift: 0.018590
- Heliocentric radial velocity: 5,573 km/s
- Apparent magnitude (V): 14.28
- Apparent magnitude (B): 14.28
- Surface brightness: 24.24 mag/arcsec^{2}
- Magnitude (J): 10.74
- Magnitude (H): 10.02
- Magnitude (K): 9.8

Characteristics
- Type: S0/a:
- Apparent size (V): 1.7' × 0.4'

Other designations
- UGC 00730, CGCG 501–115, MCG +05-03-077, 2MASX J01103658+3307351, PGC 4190.

NGC 407 is an edge-on spiral or lenticular galaxy located in the constellation Pisces. It was discovered on September 12, 1784, by William Herschel. It was described by Dreyer as "very faint, very small, southwestern of 2.", the other being NGC 410.
