= NGC 397 =

Lenticular galaxy in the constellation Pisces

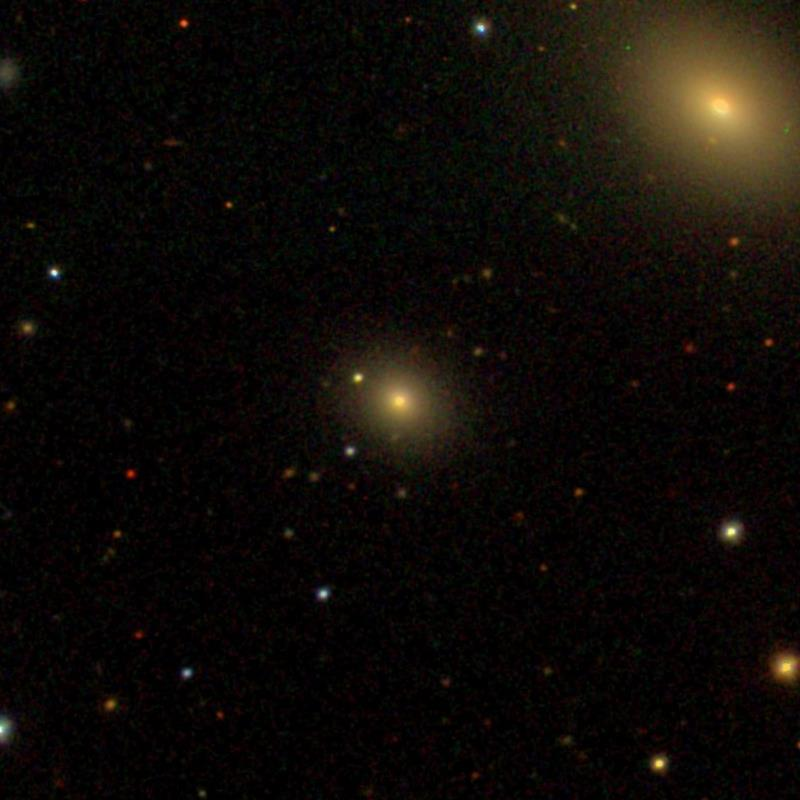
- SDSS image of NGC 397 (NGC 392 can be seen in upper right)

Observation data (J2000 epoch)
- Constellation: Pisces
- Right ascension: 01^{h} 08^{m} 31.1^{s}
- Declination: +33° 06′ 33″
- Redshift: 0.016661
- Heliocentric radial velocity: 4,995 km/s
- Apparent magnitude (V): 15.7

Characteristics
- Type: S0
- Apparent size (V): 0.2' × 0.2'

Other designations
- CGCG 501-096, MCG +05-03-064, 2MASX J01083108+3306329, 2MASXi J0108310+330633, PGC 4051.

NGC 397 is a lenticular galaxy located in the constellation Pisces. It was discovered on December 6, 1866, by Robert Ball. It was described by Dreyer as "extremely faint, small, round, very faint star to west."
