= NGC 392 =

Lenticular galaxy in the constellation Pisces

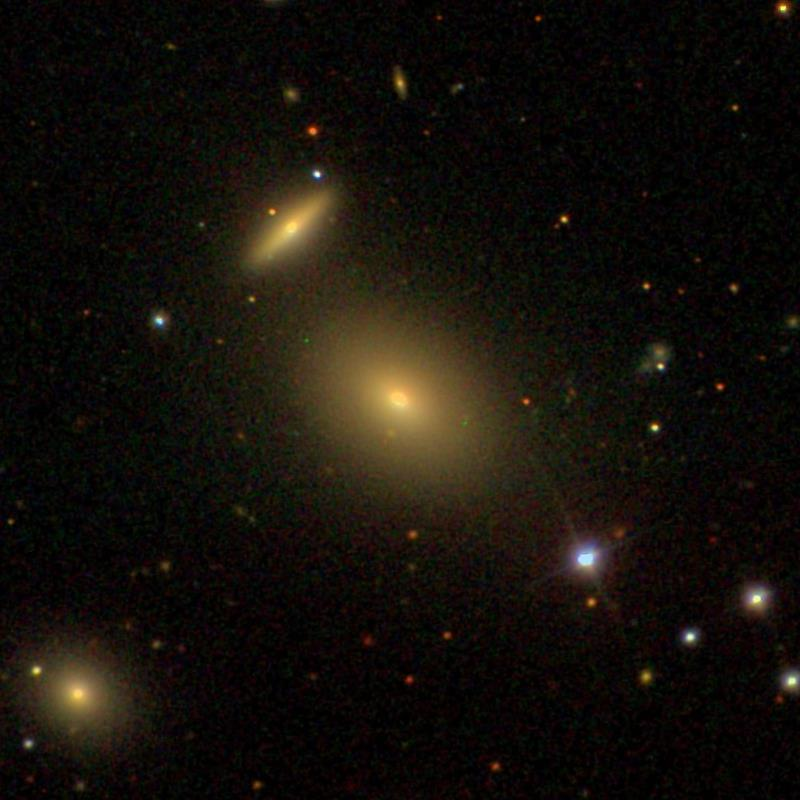
- SDSS image of NGC 392 (center)

Observation data (J2000 epoch)
- Constellation: Pisces
- Right ascension: 01^{h} 08^{m} 23.4^{s}
- Declination: +33° 08′ 01″
- Redshift: 0.015651
- Heliocentric radial velocity: 4,692 km/s
- Apparent magnitude (V): 13.68

Characteristics
- Type: S0^{−}:
- Apparent size (V): 1.2' × 0.9'

Other designations
- UGC 00700, CGCG 501-094, MCG +05-03-062, 2MASX J01082344+3308008, 2MASXi J0108234+330800, PGC 4042.

NGC 392 is a lenticular galaxy located in the constellation Pisces. It was discovered on September 12, 1784, by William Herschel. It was described by Dreyer as "faint, very small, round, much brighter middle, between 2 stars."

One supernova has been observed in NGC 392: SN 2020orw (type Ia, mag. 17.4).

NGC 392 is considered to be part of a galaxy group known as LGG 18 or NGC 452 Group. It has at least 17 members, which are NGC 383, NGC 385, NGC 399, NGC 403, NGC 420, NGC 443, NGC 444, NGC 382, NGC 452, NGC 374, NGC 388, NGC 410, NGC 414, IC 1654, IC 1618 and IC 1652.

== See also ==
- List of NGC objects (1–1000)
