= Relativistic electron beam =

Stream of elections moving at relativistic speeds

Relativistic electron beams are streams of electrons moving at relativistic speeds. They are the lasing medium in free electron lasers to be used in atmospheric research conducted at entities such as the Pan-oceanic Environmental and Atmospheric Research Laboratory (PEARL) at the University of Hawaii and NASA. It has been suggested that relativistic electron beams could be used to heat and accelerate the reaction mass in electrical rocket engines that Dr. Robert W. Bussard called quiet electric-discharge engines (QEDs).
