= Lyons Groups of Galaxies =

Astronomical catalogue

Lyons Groups of Galaxies (or LGG) is an astronomical catalog of nearby groups of galaxies complete to a limiting apparent magnitude B0=14.0 with a recession velocity smaller than 5,500 km/s. The catalogue was obtained from the Lyon-Meudon Extragalactic Database. Two methods were used in group construction: a percolation method derived from Huchra and Geller and a hierarchical method initiated by R. Brent Tully. The catalog is a synthesized version of the two results.

The LGG includes 485 groups and 3,933 member galaxies. Each group contains less than 10 galaxies, and certain members of famous galaxy clusters such as Virgo Cluster, Centaurus Cluster and Perseus-Pisces Supercluster will appear in the catalog.

== See also ==
- Abell catalogue
- New General Catalogue
- Messier Catalogue
- Hickson Compact Group

== Gallery ==
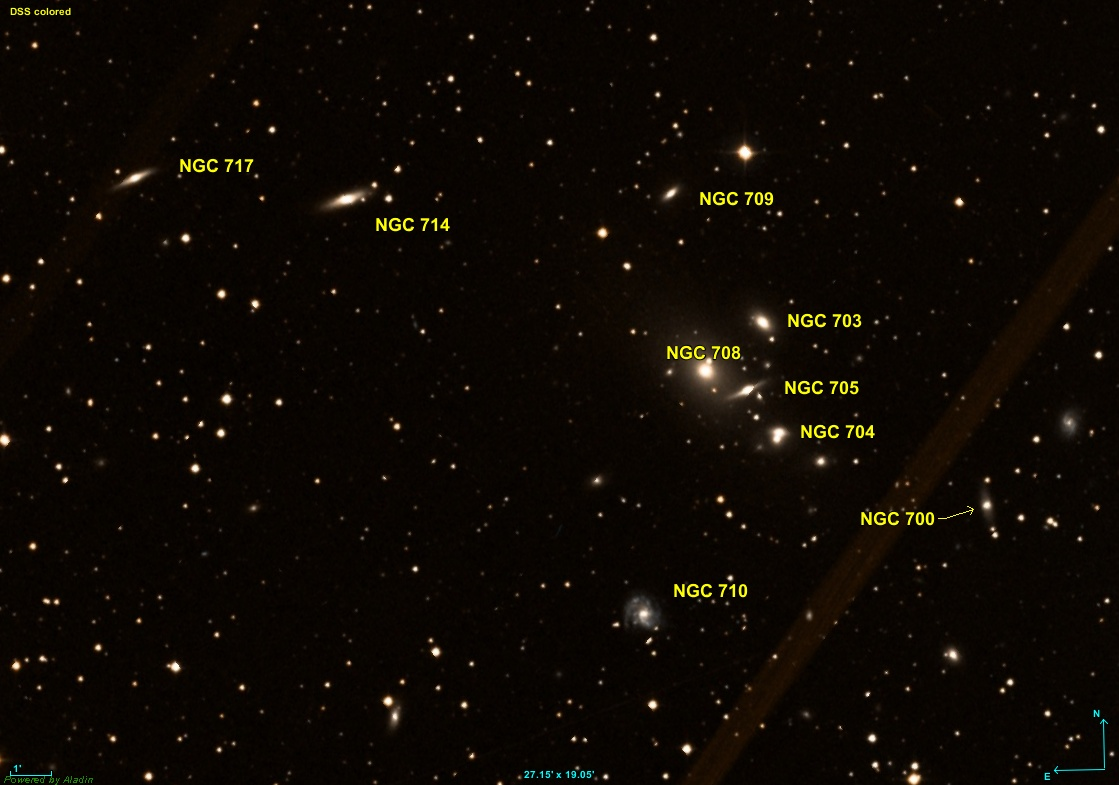
Abell 262 seen by Digitized Sky Survey (Labeled)

LGG 231 (Leo Triplet)

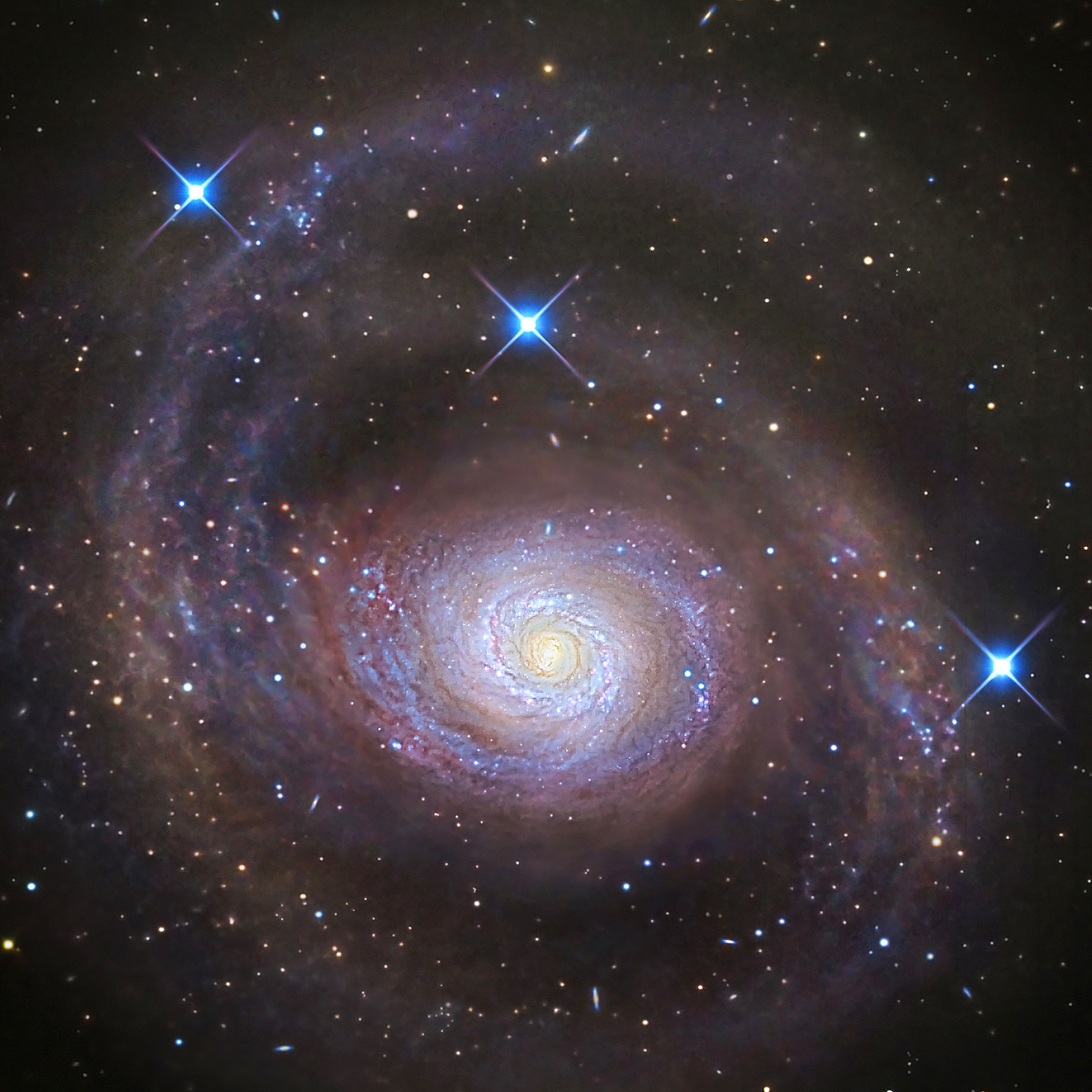
Messier 94, a member of LGG 291 or M94 Group

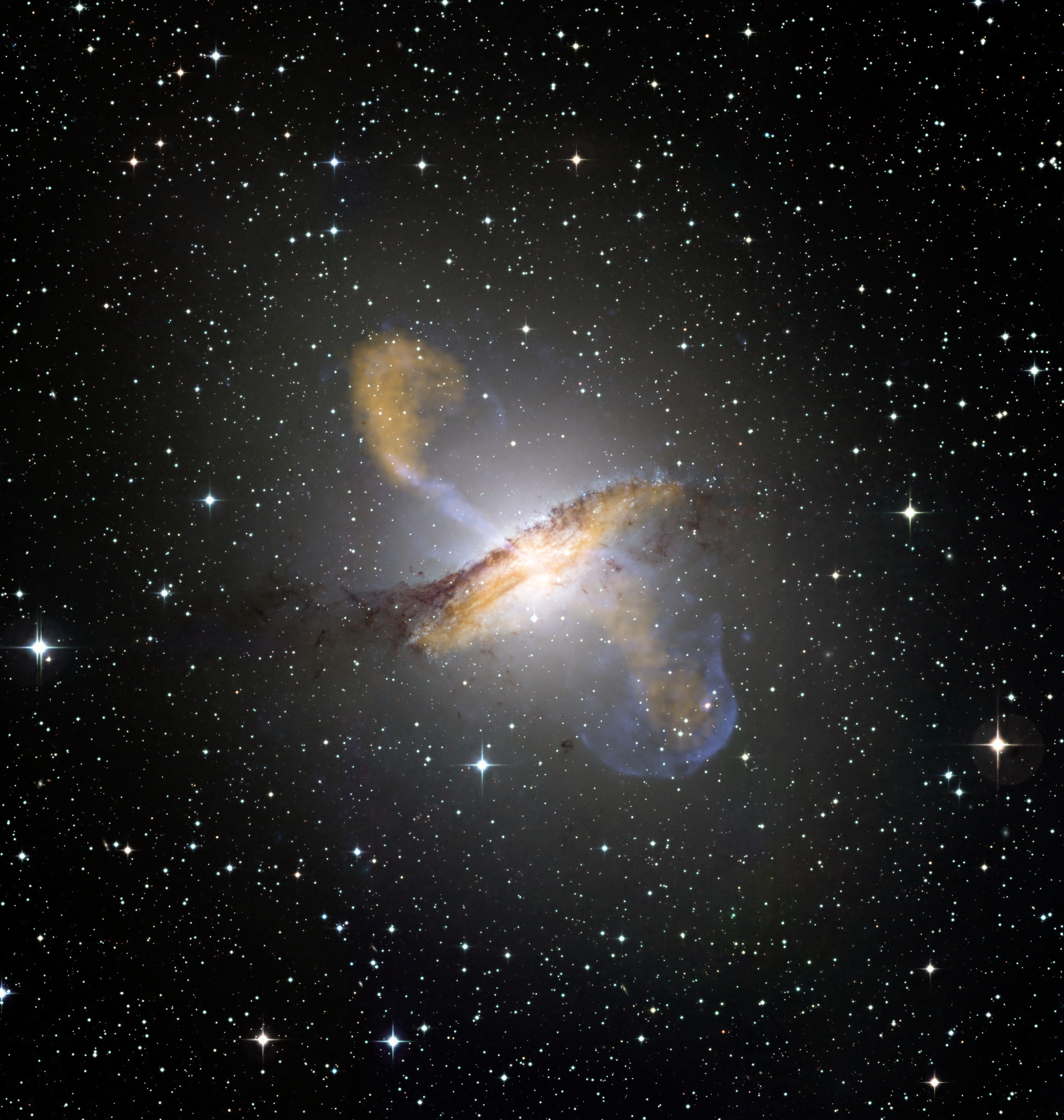
Centaurus A, a member of LGG 344 or Centaurus A subgroup.

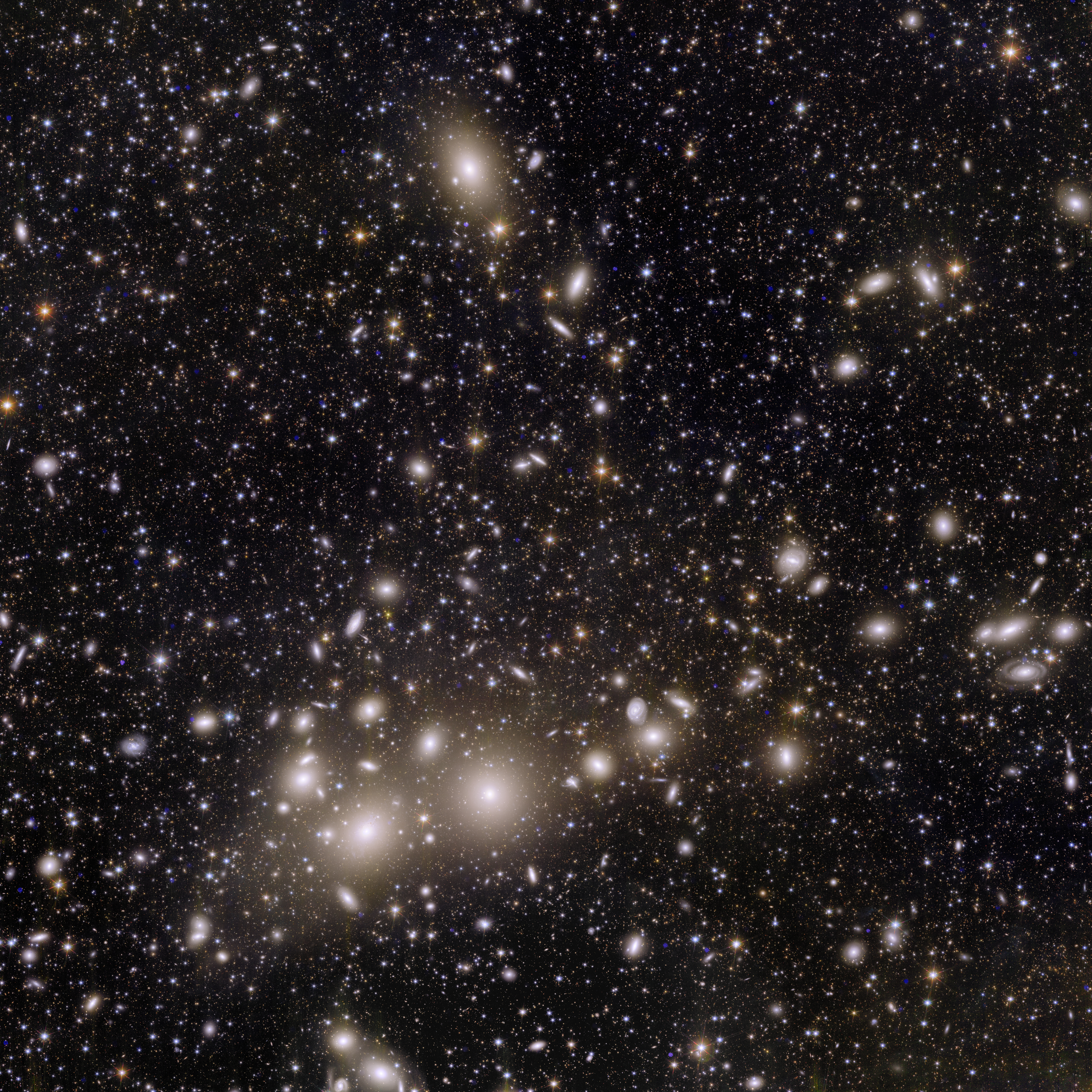
Perseus Galaxy Cluster
