= NGC 486 =

Spiral galaxy in the constellation Pisces

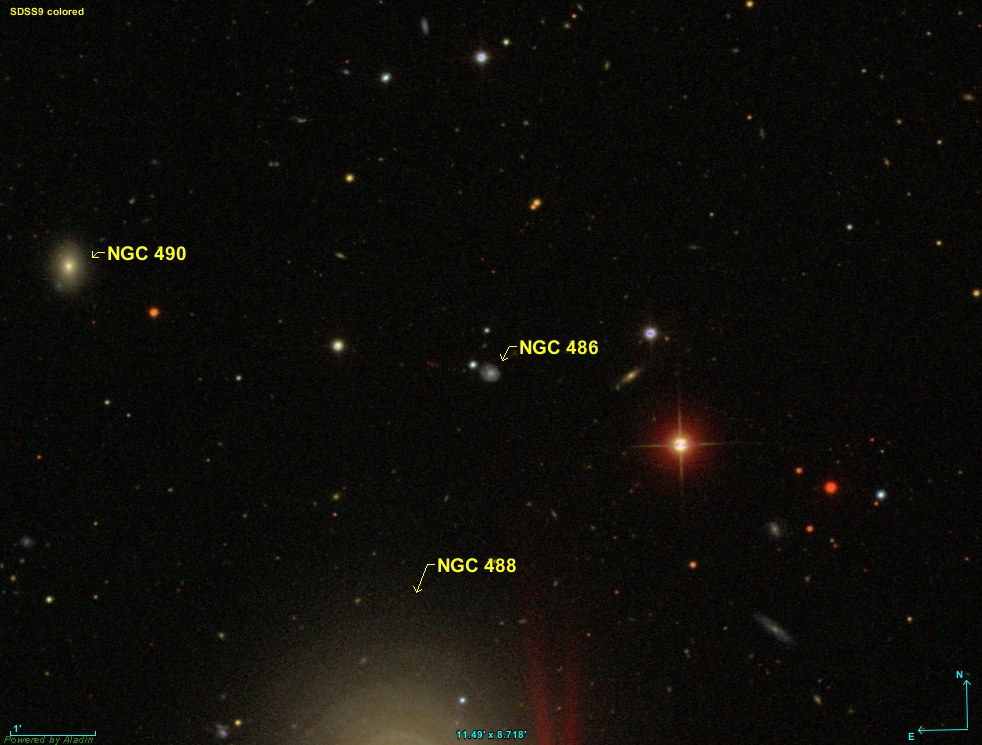
- SDSS view of NGC 486

Observation data (J2000 epoch)
- Constellation: Pisces
- Right ascension: 01^{h} 21^{m} 43.0^{s}
- Declination: +05° 20′ 47″
- Apparent magnitude (V): 15.0
- Apparent magnitude (B): 16.0

Characteristics
- Type: S?
- Apparent size (V): 0.5' × 0.2'
- Notable features: Angular proximity with faint star; commonly misidentified as PGC 4975

Other designations
- PGC 1281966, GC 275, 2MASS J01221055+0524412

NGC 486, also occasionally referred to as LEDA 1281966 or GC 275, is a spiral galaxy in the constellation Pisces. NGC 486 was discovered on December 6, 1850 by Irish engineer Bindon Blood Stoney.

NGC 486 is commonly misidentified as PGC 4975, which is sometimes referred to as NGC 492A.

== Observation history ==
Although John Dreyer, creator of the New General Catalogue, credits the discovery to astronomer William Parsons, 3rd Earl of Rosse, he notes that many of his claimed discoveries were made by one of his assistants. In the case of NGC 486, the discovery was made by Bindon Stoney, who discovered it along with NGC 490, NGC 492 and NGC 500 during his observation of NGC 488 using Lord Rosse's 72" reflecting telescope at Birr Castle in County Offaly, Ireland.

== Description ==
The object was initially described by Stoney as "extremely faint, extremely small, stellar, 5 arcmin north of h 103". The position noted not only corresponds with the coordinates of the spiral galaxy (PGC 1281966), but also a faint star. As the object was characterized as stellar, it is assumed that the initial observation was of the star, not PGC 1281966 that is generally referred to as NGC 486 today.

== See also ==
- Spiral galaxy
- List of NGC objects (1–1000)
- Pisces (constellation)
