= NGC 492 =

Galaxy in the constellation Pisces

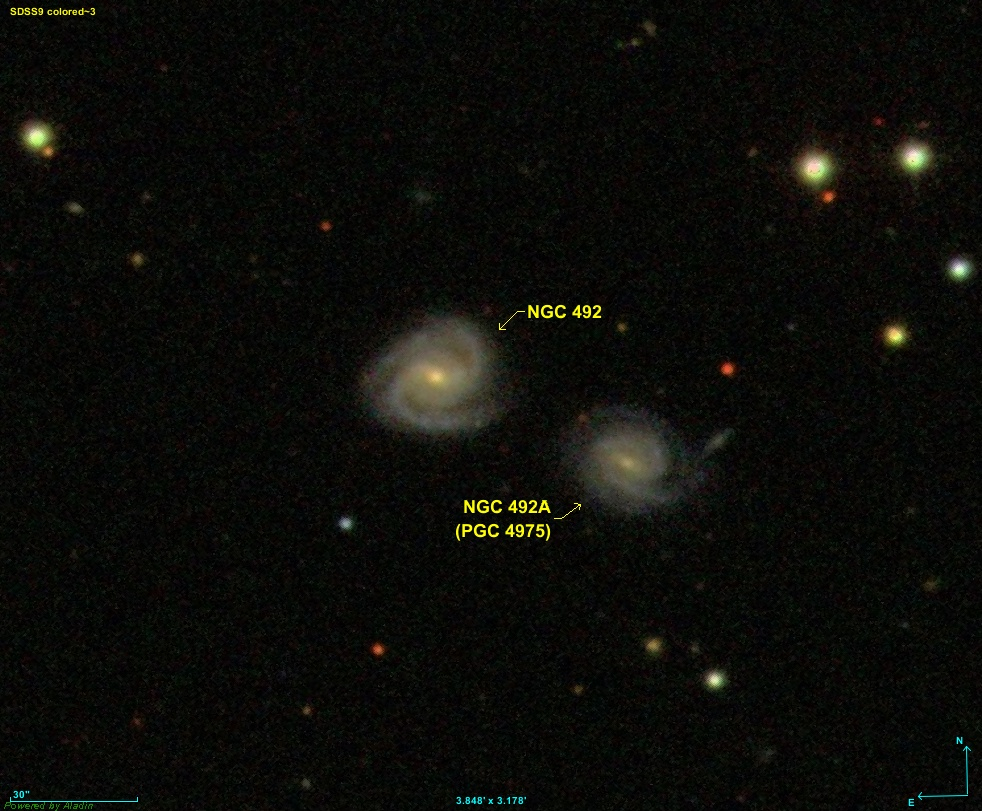
- SDSS view of NGC 492

Observation data (J2000 epoch)
- Constellation: Pisces
- Right ascension: 01^{h} 22^{m} 13.60^{s}
- Declination: +05° 25′ 01.0″
- Redshift: 0.047449
- Heliocentric radial velocity: (13888 ± 36) km/s
- Distance: 590 Mly
- Apparent magnitude (V): 15.6

Characteristics
- Type: SB?
- Apparent size (V): 0.6′ × 0.5′

Other designations
- PGC 4976, GC 280, 2MASS J01221356+0525012, Z 411.36, MGC +01-04-038

NGC 492, also occasionally referred to as PGC 4976 or GC 280, is a barred spiral galaxy in the constellation Pisces. It is located approximately 590 million light-years from Earth and was discovered on December 6, 1850 by Irish engineer Bindon Blood Stoney. Although John Dreyer, creator of the New General Catalogue, credits the discovery to astronomer William Parsons, 3rd Earl of Rosse, he notes that many of his claimed discoveries were made by one of his assistants. In the case of NGC 492, the discovery was made by Bindon Stoney, who discovered it along with NGC 486, NGC 490 and NGC 500 during his observation of NGC 488 using Lord Rosse's 72" telescope.

The object was initially described by Stoney as "extremely faint, small, round, 25" diameter, low surface brightness, no concentration". The position noted was "on line with a mag 12 star 3.7' NW and a faint pair of mag 14-14.5 stars 2' NW".

== See also ==
- Spiral galaxy
- List of NGC objects (1–1000)
- Pisces (constellation)
