= NGC 7001 =

Galaxy in the constellation Aquarius

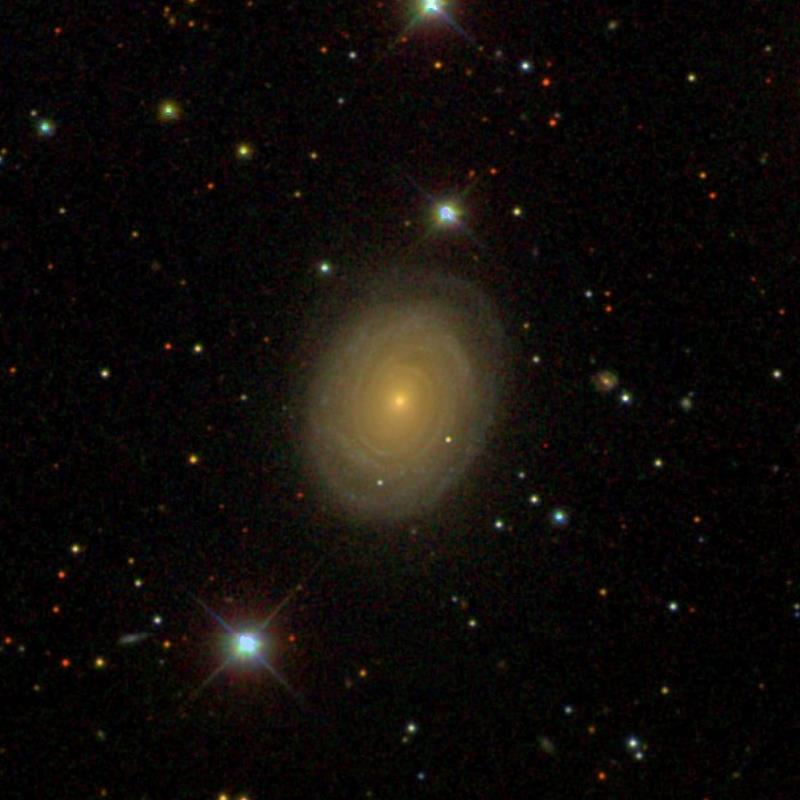
- The intermediate spiral galaxy NGC 7001 (SDSS DR14)

Observation data (J2000 epoch)
- Constellation: Aquarius
- Right ascension: 21^{h} 01^{m} 07.7^{s}
- Declination: −00° 11′ 43″
- Redshift: 0.023714
- Heliocentric radial velocity: 7,109 km/s
- Distance: 302 Mly (92.7 Mpc)
- Apparent magnitude (V): 13.8

Characteristics
- Type: SAB(rs)ab
- Mass: 4.8×10^{11} (Stellar mass) M_{☉}
- Size: ~123,100 ly (37.74 kpc) (estimated)
- Apparent size (V): 1.25 × 1.06

Other designations
- NPM1G -00.0540, IRAS 20585-0023, UGC 11663, MCG +00-53-016, PGC 65905, CGCG 374-37

NGC 7001 is an intermediate spiral galaxy located about 300 million light-years away in the constellation Aquarius. NGC 7001 has an estimated diameter of 123,000 light-years. It was discovered by English astronomer John Herschel on July 21, 1827, and was also observed by Austrian astronomer Rudolf Spitaler on September 26, 1891.

NGC 7001 has tightly wound spiral arms similar to the galaxy NGC 488. The galaxy is also host to a supermassive black hole with an estimated mass of 7 × 10^{7} M_{☉}.

== See also ==
- NGC 2
- Black Eye Galaxy
- NGC 488
- List of NGC objects (7001–7840)
- List of NGC objects
