= NGC 2930 =

Galaxy in the constellation Leo

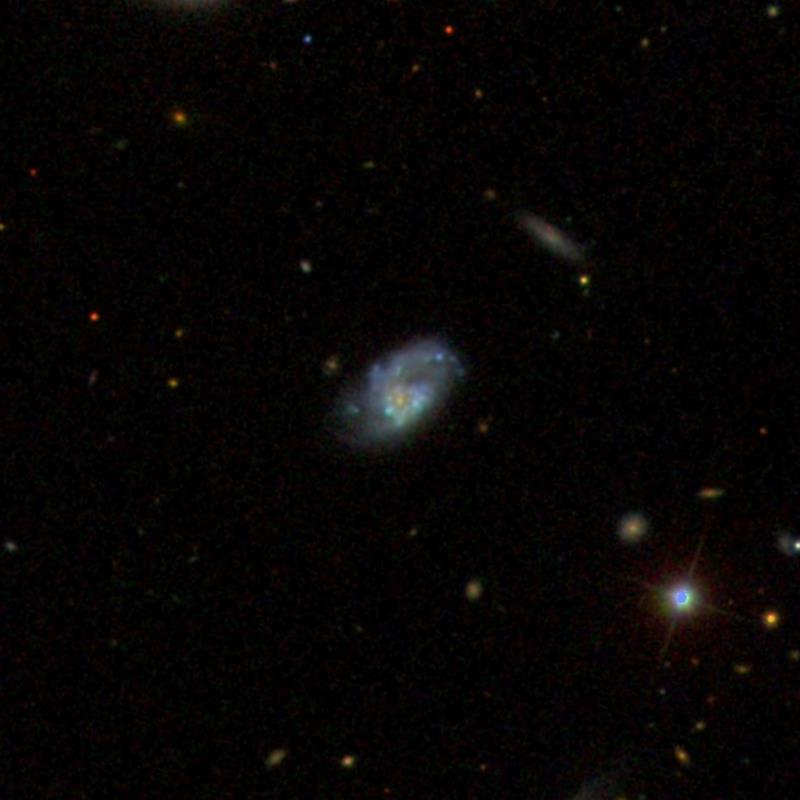
- NGC 2930 imaged by SDSS

Observation data (J2000 epoch)
- Constellation: Leo (constellation)
- Right ascension: 09^{h} 37^{m} 32.7600^{s}
- Declination: +23° 12′ 10.000″
- Redshift: 0.024624±0.0000470
- Heliocentric radial velocity: 7,382±14 km/s
- Distance: 314.44 ± 19.25 Mly (96.408 ± 5.901 Mpc)
- Group or cluster: [T2015] nest 101363
- Apparent magnitude (V): 15.10

Characteristics
- Type: S
- Size: ~60,400 ly (18.51 kpc) (estimated)
- Apparent size (V): 0.7′ × 0.4′

Other designations
- HOLM 134A, IRAS F09346+2326, MCG +04-23-018, PGC 27404, CGCG 122-035

NGC 2930 is a spiral galaxy in the constellation of Leo. Its velocity with respect to the cosmic microwave background is 7,674±25 km/s, which corresponds to a Hubble distance of 369.2 ± 25.9 Mly (113.19 ± 7.93 Mpc). However, 12 non-redshift measurements give a closer mean distance of 314.44 ± 19.25 Mly (96.408 ± 5.901 Mpc). It was discovered by German astronomer Heinrich Louis d'Arrest on 21 February 1863.

== Galaxy groups ==
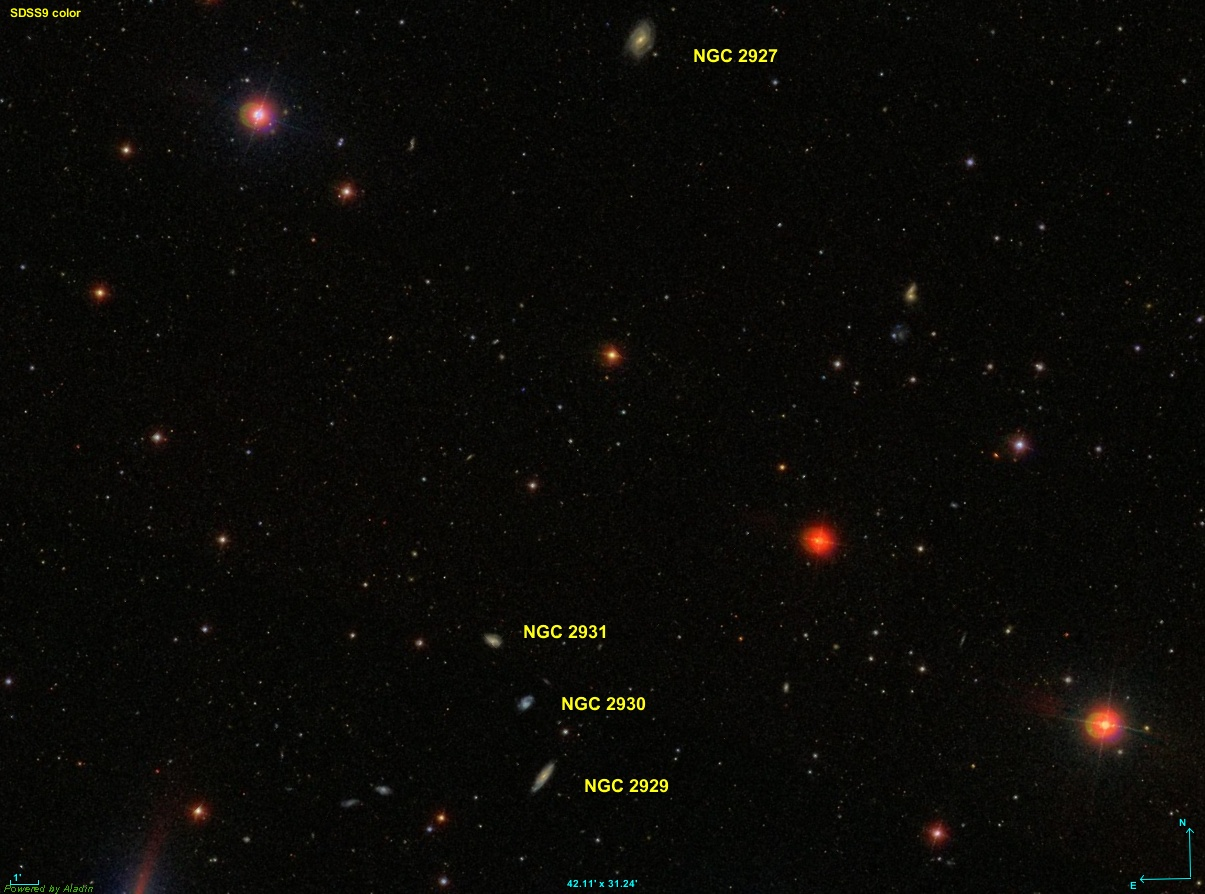
Wide field view showing the galaxy group

NGC 2930 is a member of a galaxy group known as Nest 101363. This group contains 5 galaxies, including NGC 2927, NGC 2929, NGC 2931, and LEDA 90930. Additionally, NGC 2929, NGC 2930, and NGC 2931 are listed together as Holm 134 in Erik Holmberg's A Study of Double and Multiple Galaxies Together with Inquiries into some General Metagalactic Problems, published in 1937.

== Supernovae ==
Two supernovae have been observed in NGC 2930:

- SN 2005M (Type Ia, mag. 18.8) was discovered by Tim Puckett and D. George on 19 January 2005.
- SN 2026iql (Type II, mag. 20.8868) was discovered by the Zwicky Transient Facility on 5 April 2026.

== See also ==
- List of NGC objects (2001–3000)
