= NGC 1633 =

Galaxy in the constellation Taurus

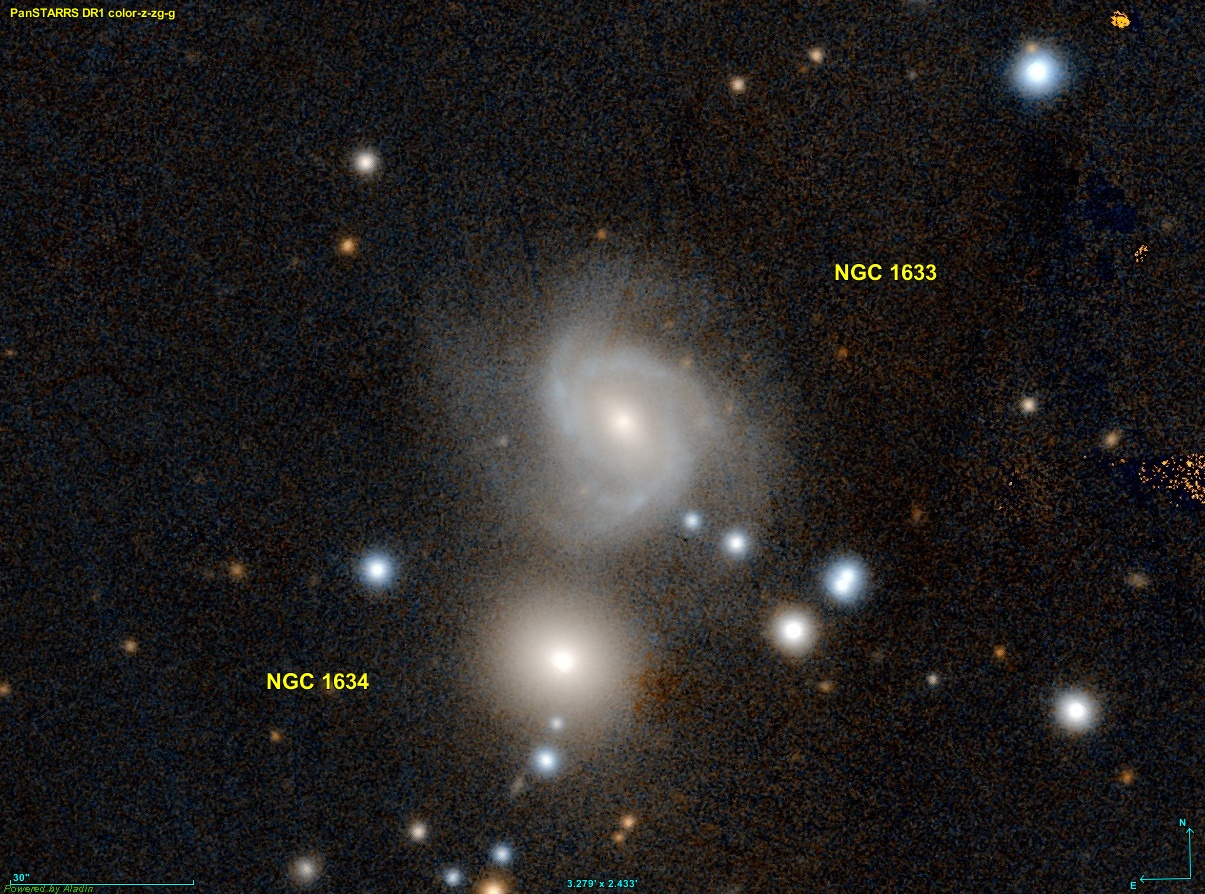
- NGC 1633 and NGC 1634 imaged by Pan-STARRS

Observation data (J2000 epoch)
- Constellation: Taurus
- Right ascension: 04^{h} 40^{m} 09.1088^{s}
- Declination: +07° 20′ 58.172″
- Redshift: 0.016632±0.00000700
- Heliocentric radial velocity: 4,986±2 km/s
- Distance: 187.87 ± 5.23 Mly (57.600 ± 1.604 Mpc)
- Group or cluster: NGC 1762 Group (LGG 120)
- Apparent magnitude (V): 14.36

Characteristics
- Type: SAB(s)ab
- Size: ~68,900 ly (21.14 kpc) (estimated)
- Apparent size (V): 1.0′ × 0.9′

Other designations
- HOLM 079A, IRAS 04374+0715, 2MASX J04400910+0720577, UGC 3125, MCG +01-12-014, PGC 15774, CGCG 419-023

NGC 1633 is an intermediate spiral galaxy in the constellation of Taurus. Its velocity with respect to the cosmic microwave background is 4,930±4 km/s, which corresponds to a Hubble distance of 237.1 ± 16.6 Mly (72.71 ± 5.09 Mpc). However, three non-redshift measurements give a closer mean distance of 187.87 ± 5.23 Mly (57.600 ± 1.604 Mpc). It was discovered by German-British astronomer William Herschel on 9 December 1798.

== NGC 1762 Group ==
NGC 1633 is a member of NGC 1762 group (also known as LGG 120). This group contains 27 galaxies, including NGC 1590, NGC 1642, NGC 1691, NGC 1713, NGC 1719, NGC 1762, and IC 392.

== Supernova ==
One supernova has been observed in NGC 1633:

- SN 2010kg (Type Ia, mag. 18.8) was discovered by the Lick Observatory Supernova Search (LOSS) on 29 November 2010.

== See also ==
- List of NGC objects (1001–2000)
