= NGC 109 =

Spiral galaxy in the constellation Andromeda

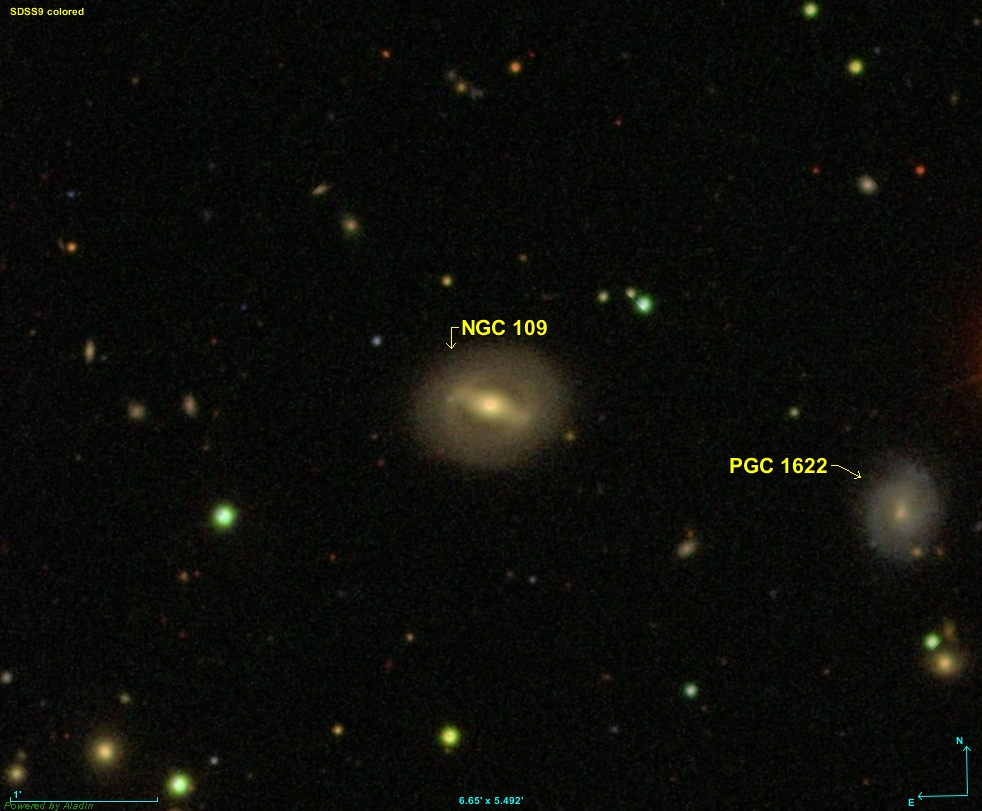
- NGC 109 imaged by SDSS

Observation data (J2000 epoch)
- Constellation: Andromeda
- Right ascension: 00^{h} 26^{m} 14.636^{s}
- Declination: +21° 48′ 26.64″
- Redshift: 0.018206
- Heliocentric radial velocity: 5458
- Distance: 216.40 ± 17.85 Mly (66.350 ± 5.473 Mpc)
- Apparent magnitude (V): 14.08
- Apparent magnitude (B): 15.0

Characteristics
- Type: SB(r)a
- Size: 81,800 ly (25,090 pc) (Note: POSS1 103a-O values used.)
- Apparent size (V): 1.1′ × 1.0′

Other designations
- UGC 251, MCG +04-02-020, PGC 1606

NGC 109 is a spiral galaxy estimated to be about 240 million light-years away in the constellation of Andromeda. It was discovered by Heinrich d'Arrest in 1861 and its magnitude is 13.7.

One supernova has been observed in NGC 109: SN 2019upw (type Ia, mag. 17.5).

== See also ==
- List of NGC objects (1–1000)
