= NGC 543 =

Galaxy in the constellation Cetus

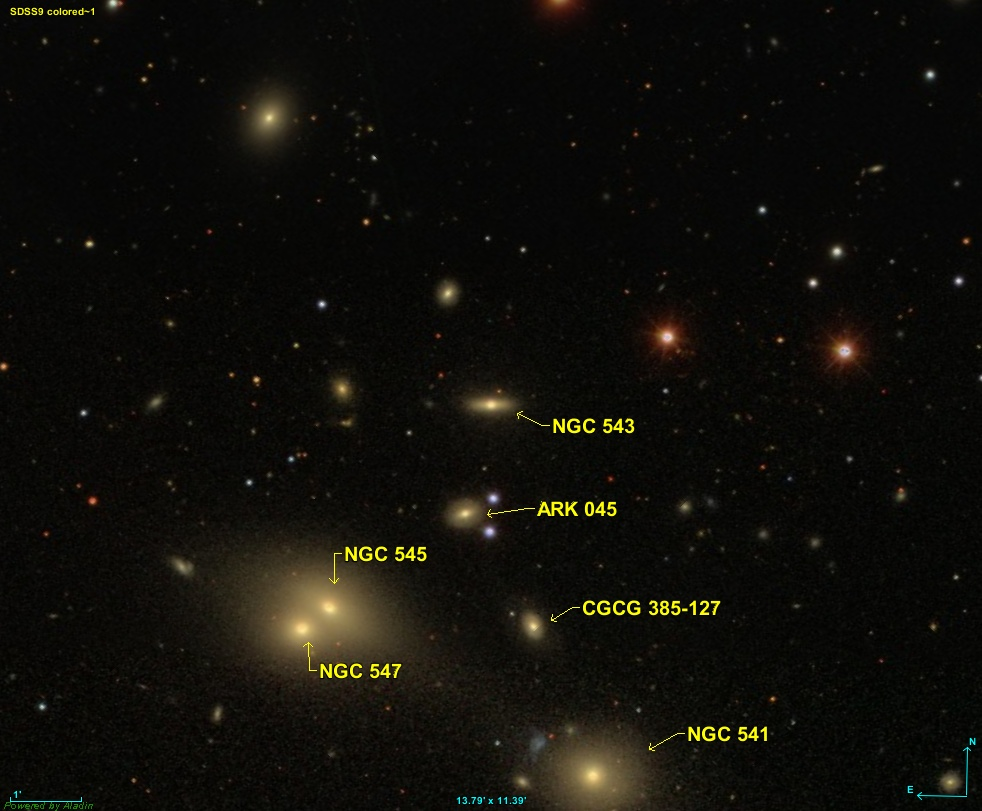
- NGC 543 imaged by SDSS

Observation data (J2000 epoch)
- Constellation: Cetus
- Right ascension: 01^{h} 25^{m} 50.00503^{s}
- Declination: −01° 17′ 34.0010″
- Redshift: 0.017575
- Heliocentric radial velocity: 5223 km/s
- Distance: 324.66 ± 0.75 Mly (99.54 ± 0.23 Mpc)
- Group or cluster: Abell 194
- Apparent magnitude (B): 15.0

Characteristics
- Type: S0
- Size: ~78,300 ly (24.01 kpc) (estimated)
- Apparent size (V): 0.6′ × 0.3′

Other designations
- MCG +00-04-138, PGC 5311, CGCG 385-130

NGC 543 is an elliptical galaxy located around 324 million light-years away in the constellation Cetus. NGC 543 was discovered by German astronomer Heinrich Louis d'Arrest on October 31, 1864. It is not known to have much star formation, and it is a member of the galaxy cluster Abell 194.

== See also ==
- List of NGC objects (1–1000)
