= NGC 7827 =

Galaxy in the constellation Pisces

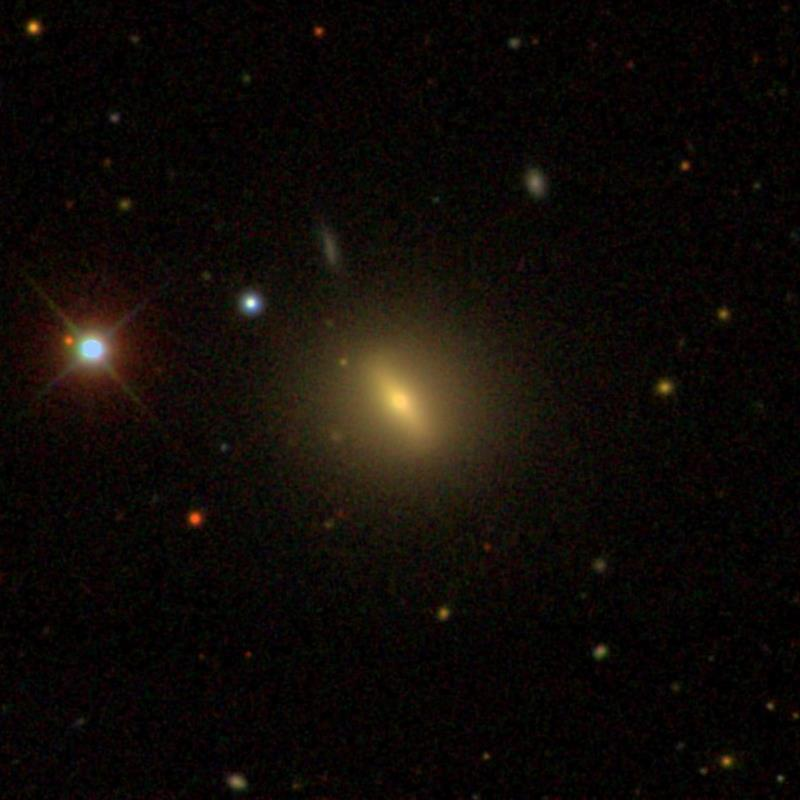

Observation data
- Constellation: Pisces
- Right ascension: 00^{h} 06^{m} 47^{s}
- Declination: +05° 22′ 01″

NGC 7827 is a lenticular galaxy (SB0 type) located in the constellation Pisces. Its other names include: PGC 378, UGC 38 or MCG+01-01-027. It was discovered on September 25, 1830, by the astronomer John Herschel. It has a galactic magnitude of 10.332. It appears to be a faint, small galaxy with the middle being brighter.

The apparent size of NGC 7827 is around 1.2 x 0.9 arc minutes, and the visual magnitude is about 14.1. The measurements are listed in the catalogue and yield an approximate redshift of 0.01766, while one estimate based on the redshift is about 74.6 Mpc from the Earth. The CMB-frame recession velocity and the Hubble constant of 70 km/s/Mpc lead to an NGC/IC distance estimate of ~230 million light-years. It was first observed by John Herschel on 25 September 1830, then observed by Heinrich d'Arrest on 16 December 1862.
