= NGC 485 =

Spiral galaxy in the constellation Pisces

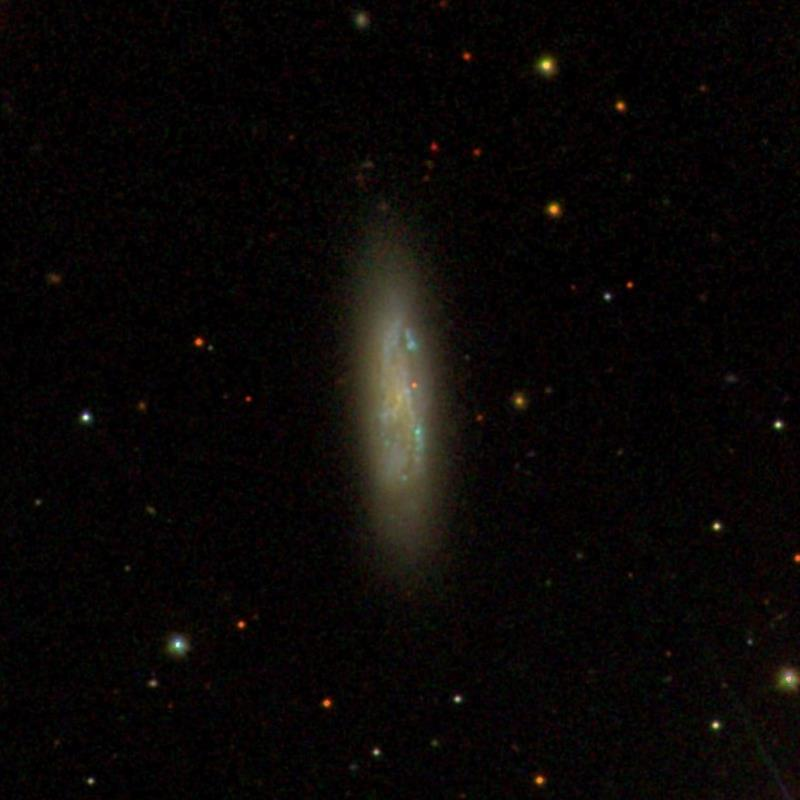
- SDSS view of NGC 485

Observation data (J2000 epoch)
- Constellation: Pisces
- Right ascension: 01^{h} 21^{m} 27.594^{s}
- Declination: +07° 01′ 05.01″
- Redshift: 0.007495 ± 0.000007
- Heliocentric radial velocity: (2239 ± 2) km/s
- Distance: 86 Mly
- Apparent magnitude (V): 13.2

Characteristics
- Type: Sa
- Apparent size (V): 1.7′ × 0.6′

Other designations
- UGC 895, MCG +01-04-032, PGC 4921

NGC 485, also commonly referred to as PGC 4921 or GC 270, is a spiral galaxy in the constellation Pisces. It is located approximately 86 million light-years from Earth and was discovered on January 8, 1828 by astronomer William Herschel. It was later also observed by Heinrich d'Arrest and Herman Schultz. When NGC 485 was originally categorized in the New General Catalogue by John Louis Eil Dreyer in 1888, it was incorrectly described as a "considerably faint, pretty large, round, 8th magnitude star 3 1/2 arcmin to southwest".

NGC 485 is part of a galaxy group known as NGC 488 Group or LGG 21. It has at least 7 members, which are NGC 485, NGC 488, NGC 490, UGC 942, UGC 882, UGC 871 and UGC 888.

== See also ==
- Spiral galaxy
- List of NGC objects (1–1000)
- Pisces (constellation)

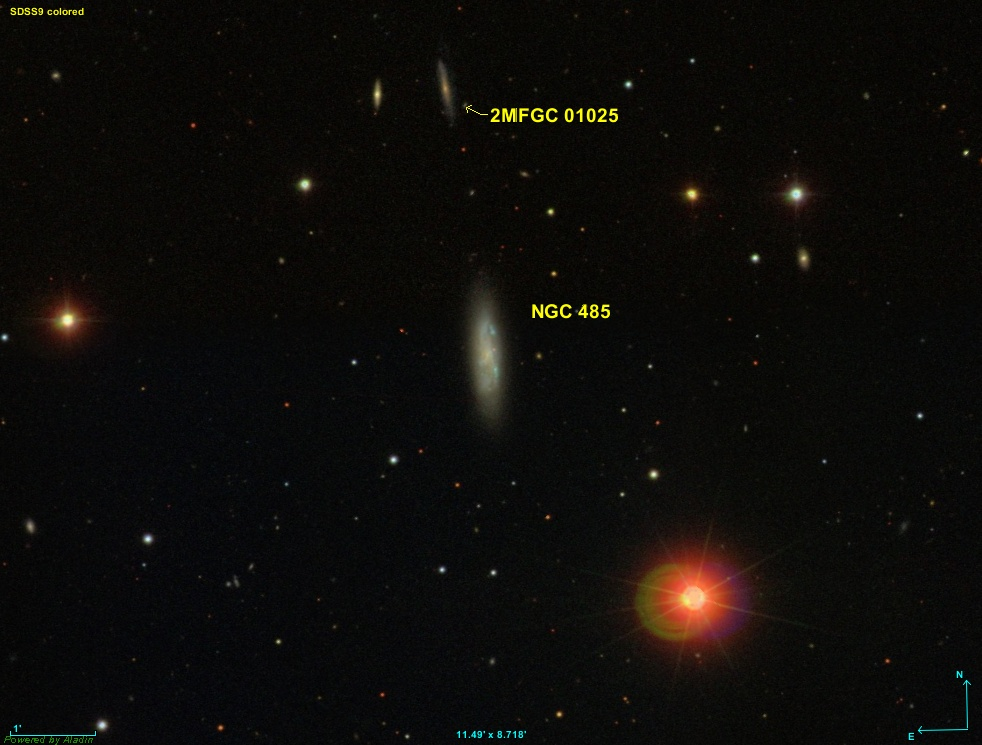
NGC 485 (SDSS)
