= NGC 656 =

Lenticular galaxy in the constellation Pisces

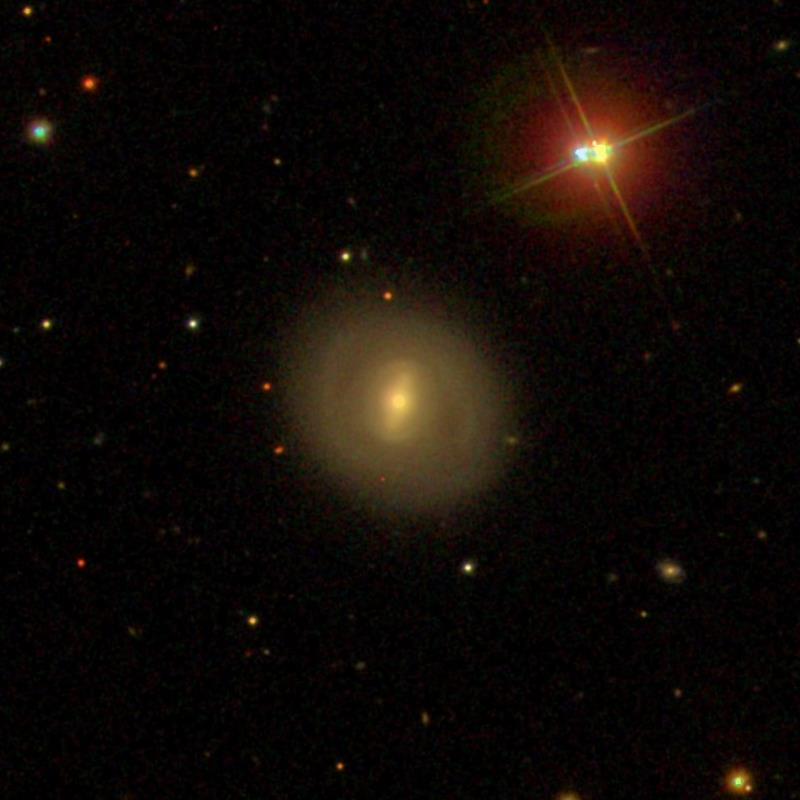
- SDSS image of NGC 656

Observation data (J2000 epoch)
- Constellation: Pisces
- Right ascension: 01^{h} 42^{m} 27.229^{s}
- Declination: +26° 08′ 35.06″
- Redshift: 0.013129
- Heliocentric radial velocity: 3910 km/s
- Distance: 174.8 Mly (53.60 Mpc)
- Apparent magnitude (B): 13.50

Characteristics
- Type: SB0

Other designations
- UGC 1194, MCG +04-05-002, PGC 6293

NGC 656 is a barred lenticular galaxy located in the constellation Pisces about 175 million light-years from the Milky Way. It was discovered by the Prussian astronomer Heinrich d'Arrest in 1865.

== See also ==
- List of NGC objects (1–1000)
- Heinrich d'Arrest
