= NGC 1590 =

Galaxy in the constellation Taurus

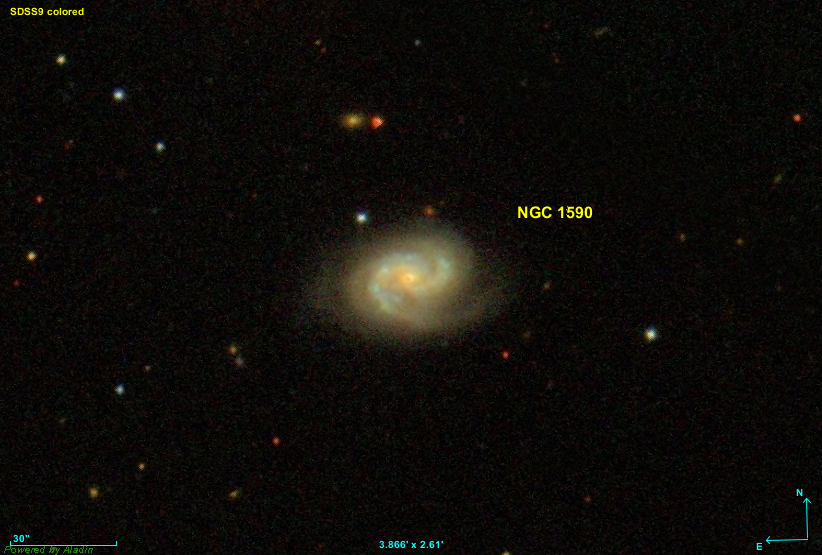
- NGC 1590 imaged by SDSS

Observation data (J2000 epoch)
- Constellation: Taurus
- Right ascension: 04^{h} 31^{m} 10.2655^{s}
- Declination: +07° 37′ 51.108″
- Redshift: 0.012999
- Heliocentric radial velocity: 3897 ± 6 km/s
- Distance: 184.1 ± 12.9 Mly (56.43 ± 3.95 Mpc)
- Group or cluster: NGC 1762 Group (LGG 120)
- Apparent magnitude (V): 14.5

Characteristics
- Type: Sbc D
- Size: ~64,000 ly (19.62 kpc) (estimated)
- Apparent size (V): 0.9′ × 0.7′

Other designations
- IRAS 04284+0731, 2MASX J04311020+0737513, UGC 3071, MCG +01-12-008, PGC 15368, CGCG 419-014

NGC 1590 is a spiral galaxy in the constellation of Taurus. Its velocity with respect to the cosmic microwave background is 3826 ± 8 km/s, which corresponds to a Hubble distance of 56.43 ± 3.95 Mpc (~184 million light-years). It was discovered by German astronomer Heinrich d'Arrest on 28 October 1865.

== NGC 1762 Group ==
NGC 1590 is part of the NGC 1762 Group (also known as LGG 120) that includes at least 27 galaxies, including IC 392, NGC 1633, NGC 1642, NGC 1691, NGC 1713, NGC 1719, and NGC 1762, among others.

== Supernova ==
One supernova has been observed in NGC 1590:

- SN 2007rz (Type Ic, mag. 16.9) was discovered by the Lick Observatory Supernova Search (LOSS) on 8 December 2007.

== See also ==
- List of NGC objects (1001–2000)
