= NGC 1642 =

Galaxy in the constellation Taurus

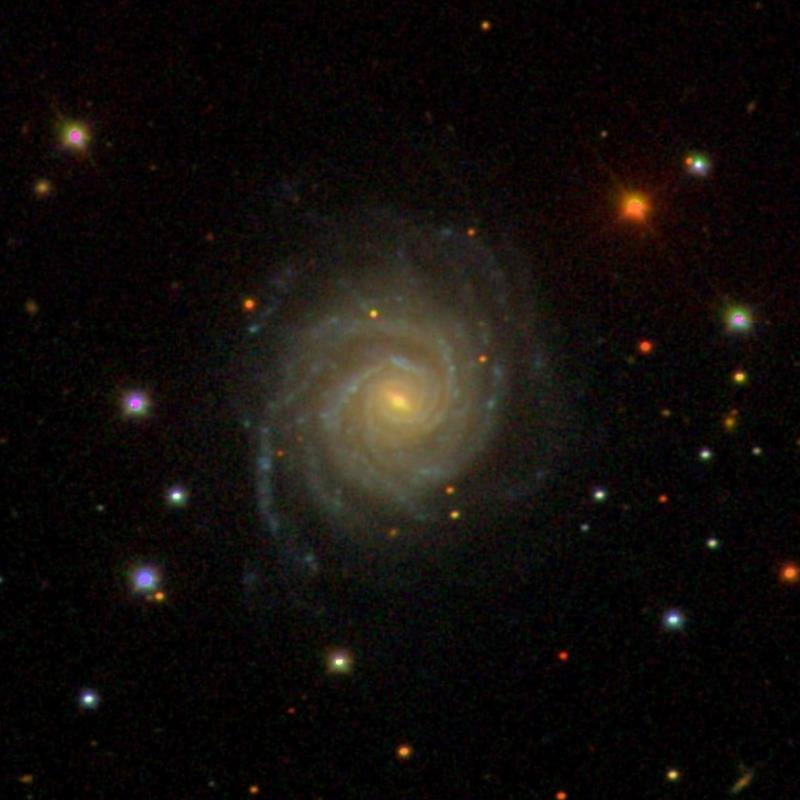
- NGC 1642 imaged by SDSS

Observation data (J2000 epoch)
- Constellation: Taurus
- Right ascension: 04^{h} 42^{m} 54.9213^{s}
- Declination: +00° 37′ 07.198″
- Redshift: 0.015419
- Heliocentric radial velocity: 4622 ± 0 km/s
- Distance: 220.1 ± 15.4 Mly (67.48 ± 4.72 Mpc)
- Group or cluster: NGC 1762 group (LGG 120)
- Apparent magnitude (V): 12.6
- Magnitude (J): 10.561
- Magnitude (H): 9.890
- Magnitude (K): 9.570

Characteristics
- Type: SA(rs)c
- Size: ~42,400 ly (13.01 kpc) (estimated)
- Apparent size (V): 1.7′ × 1.2′

Other designations
- IRAS 04403+0031, 2MASX J04425489+0037070, UGC 3140, MCG +00-12-072, PGC 15867, CGCG 393-073

NGC 1642 is a spiral galaxy in the constellation of Taurus. Its velocity with respect to the cosmic microwave background is 4575 ± 3 km/s, which corresponds to a Hubble distance of 220.1 ± 15.4 Mly (67.48 ± 4.72 Mpc). However, one non-redshift measurement gives a much closer distance of 69 Mly (21.3 Mpc). It was discovered by German astronomer Heinrich d'Arrest on 29 December 1861.

== NGC 1762 Group ==
According to A.M. Garcia, the galaxy NGC 1642 is part of the NGC 1762 group (also known as LGG 120) that includes at least 27 galaxies, including IC 392, NGC 1590, NGC 1633, NGC 1691, NGC 1713, NGC 1719, and NGC 1762, among others.

== Supernova ==
One supernova has been observed in NGC 1642:

- SN 2023bhm (Type Ia-91bg-like, mag. 18.1) was discovered by the Zwicky Transient Facility on 2 February 2023.

== See also ==
- List of NGC objects (1001–2000)
