= NGC 272 =

Open star cluster in the constellation Andromeda

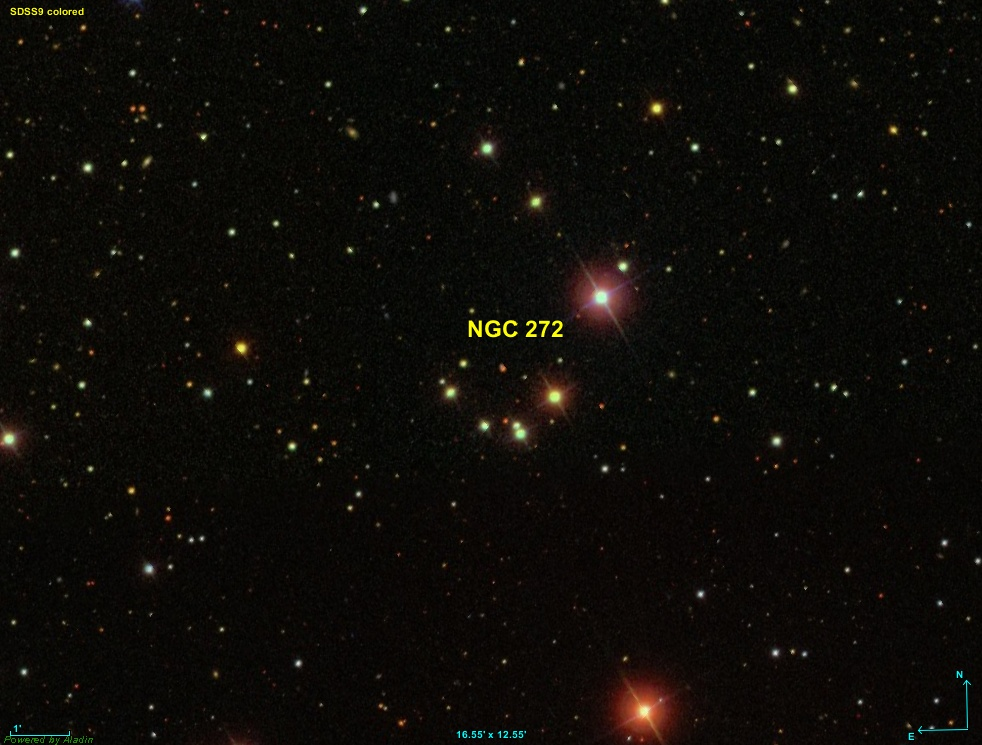
- DSS image of NGC 272

Observation data (J2000 epoch)
- Right ascension: 00^{h} 51^{m} 25.1^{s}
- Declination: +35° 49′ 18″
- Apparent magnitude (V): 8.5

Physical characteristics

Associations
- Constellation: Andromeda

NGC 272 is an open cluster (rather an L-shaped asterism) located in the constellation Andromeda. It was discovered on August 2, 1864, by Heinrich d'Arrest.
