= NGC 490 =

Lenticular galaxy in the constellation Pisces

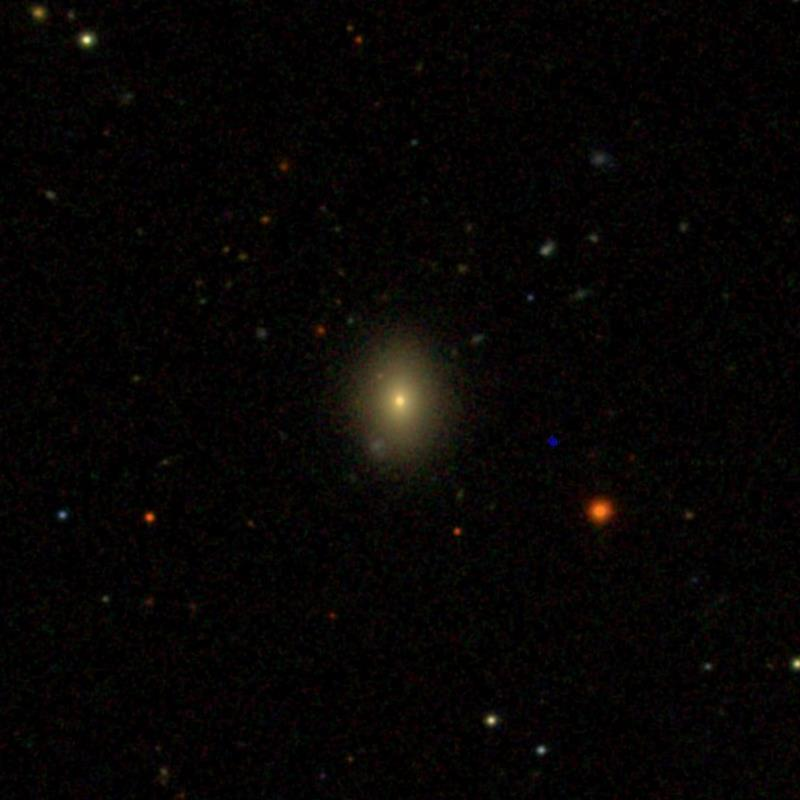
- SDSS view of NGC 490

Observation data (J2000 epoch)
- Constellation: Pisces
- Right ascension: 01^{h} 22^{m} 02.87^{s}
- Declination: +05° 22′ 01.9″
- Redshift: 0.00742 ± 0.00006
- Heliocentric radial velocity: (+2217 ± 17) km/s
- Distance: 85 Mly
- Apparent magnitude (V): 14.4

Characteristics
- Type: S0/a?
- Apparent size (V): 0.7′ × 0.5′

Other designations
- PGC 4973, GC 277, 2MASS J01220285+0522021, MCG +01-04-035

NGC 490, also occasionally referred to as PGC 4973 or GC 277, is a lenticular galaxy in the constellation Pisces. It is located approximately 85 million light-years from Earth and was discovered on December 6, 1850, by Irish engineer Bindon Blood Stoney. Although John Dreyer, creator of the New General Catalogue, credits the discovery to astronomer William Parsons, he notes that many of his claimed discoveries were made by one of his assistants. In the case of NGC 490, the discovery was made by Bindon Stoney, who discovered it along with NGC 486, NGC 492 and NGC 500 during his observation of NGC 488.

The object was initially described in the New General Catalogue as "very faint, very small, round, 8 arcmin northeast of h 103 (=NGC 488)".

NGC 490 is part of a galaxy group known as NGC 488 Group or LGG 21. It has at least 7 members, which are NGC 490, NGC 485, NGC 488, UGC 942, UGC 882, UGC 871 and UGC 888.

== See also ==
- Lenticular galaxy
- List of NGC objects (1–1000)
- Pisces (constellation)
