= NGC 63 =

Galaxy in the constellation Pisces

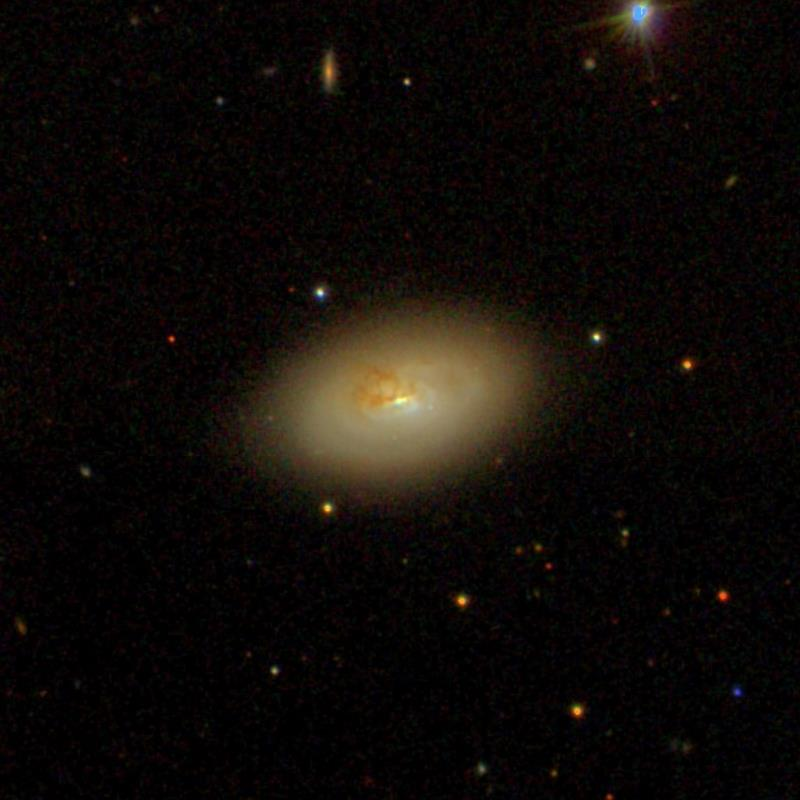
- SDSS image of NGC 63

Observation data (J2000 epoch)
- Constellation: Pisces
- Right ascension: 00^{h} 17^{m} 45.54685^{s}
- Declination: +11° 27′ 01.0220″
- Redshift: 0.003883
- Heliocentric radial velocity: 1162 km/s
- Distance: 60.73 ± 0.39 Mly (18.62 ± 0.12 Mpc)
- Group or cluster: NGC 63 Group (LGG 3)
- Apparent magnitude (V): 12.70
- Apparent magnitude (B): 12.63

Characteristics
- Type: S pec
- Size: ~36,400 ly (11.17 kpc) (estimated)
- Apparent size (V): 1.7′ × 1.1′

Other designations
- IRAS 00151+1110, UGC 167, MCG +02-01-030, PGC 1160

NGC 63 is a peculiar spiral galaxy in the constellation Pisces. NGC 63 is its New General Catalogue designation. The galaxy was discovered by Heinrich Louis d'Arrest on 27 August 1865. It has an apparent V-band magnitude of 12.70.

NGC 63 is part of the group of galaxies that bears its name. The NGC 63 group (also known as LGG 3) includes at least two other galaxies: UGC 156 and UGC 191.

== See also ==
- List of NGC objects (1–1000)
