= NGC 163 =

Galaxy in the constellation Cetus

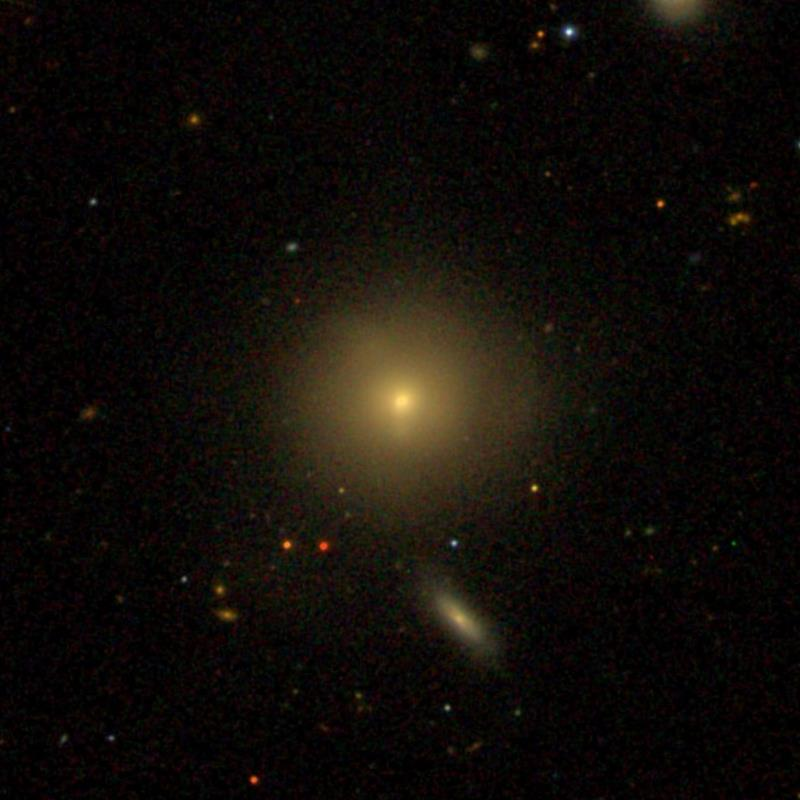
- SDSS image of NGC 163

Observation data (J2000 epoch)
- Constellation: Cetus
- Right ascension: 00^{h} 35^{m} 59.840^{s}
- Declination: −10° 07′ 18.32″
- Redshift: 0.019954
- Heliocentric radial velocity: 5982
- Distance: 228.64 ± 53.13 Mly (70.100 ± 16.291 Mpc)
- Apparent magnitude (V): 12.70
- Apparent magnitude (B): 13.64

Characteristics
- Type: E0
- Size: 103,000 ly (31,570 pc) (Note: RC3 D_25; R_25 (blue) values used.)
- Apparent size (V): 1.19′ × 1.11′

Other designations
- MGC-02-02-066, PGC 2149

NGC 163 is an elliptical galaxy in the constellation Cetus. It was discovered by Heinrich Louis d'Arrest on 20 September 1865. Seen through an optical telescope it ranges up to 13th magnitude.
