= NGC 1285 =

Galaxy in the constellation Eridanus

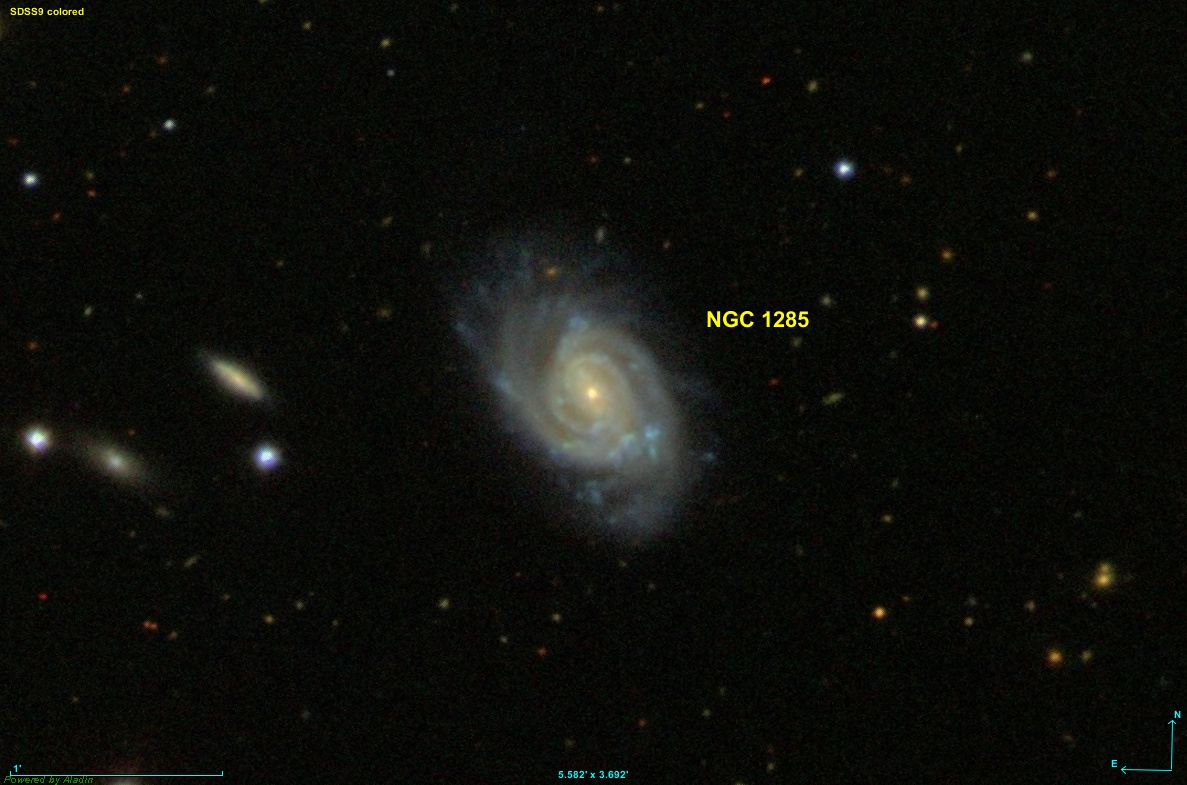
- NGC 1285 imaged by SDSS

Observation data (J2000 epoch)
- Constellation: Eridanus
- Right ascension: 03^{h} 17^{m} 53.4542^{s}
- Declination: −07° 17′ 51.847″
- Redshift: 0.017512
- Heliocentric radial velocity: 5250 ± 3 km/s
- Distance: 244.4 ± 17.1 Mly (74.94 ± 5.25 Mpc)
- Apparent magnitude (V): 12.8

Characteristics
- Type: (R')SB(r)b pec
- Size: ~81,300 ly (24.92 kpc) (estimated)
- Apparent size (V): 1.5′ × 1.1′

Other designations
- IRAS 03154-0728, 2MASX J03175341-0717517, MCG -01-09-026, PGC 12259

NGC 1285 is a barred spiral galaxy in the constellation of Eridanus. Its velocity with respect to the cosmic microwave background is 5081 ± 12 km/s, which corresponds to a Hubble distance of 244.4 ± 17.1 Mly (74.94 ± 5.25 Mpc). However, three non-redshift measurements give a much closer distance of 180.47 ± 3.24 Mly (55.333 ± 0.994 Mpc). It was discovered by Heinrich Louis d'Arrest on 28 October 1865.

== Supernovae ==
Three supernovae have been observed in NGC 1285:

- SN 2004F (Type IIn-pec, mag. 17.8) was discovered by the Lick Observatory Supernova Survey on 16 January 2004.
- SN 2013el (Type Ib-pec, mag. 15.5) was discovered by Stu Parker on 11 July 2013.
- SN 2017fvf (Type IIP, mag. 17.81) was discovered by the Gaia Photometric Science Alerts programme on 30 July 2017.

== See also ==
- List of NGC objects (1001–2000)
