= NGC 1762 =

Galaxy in the constellation Orion

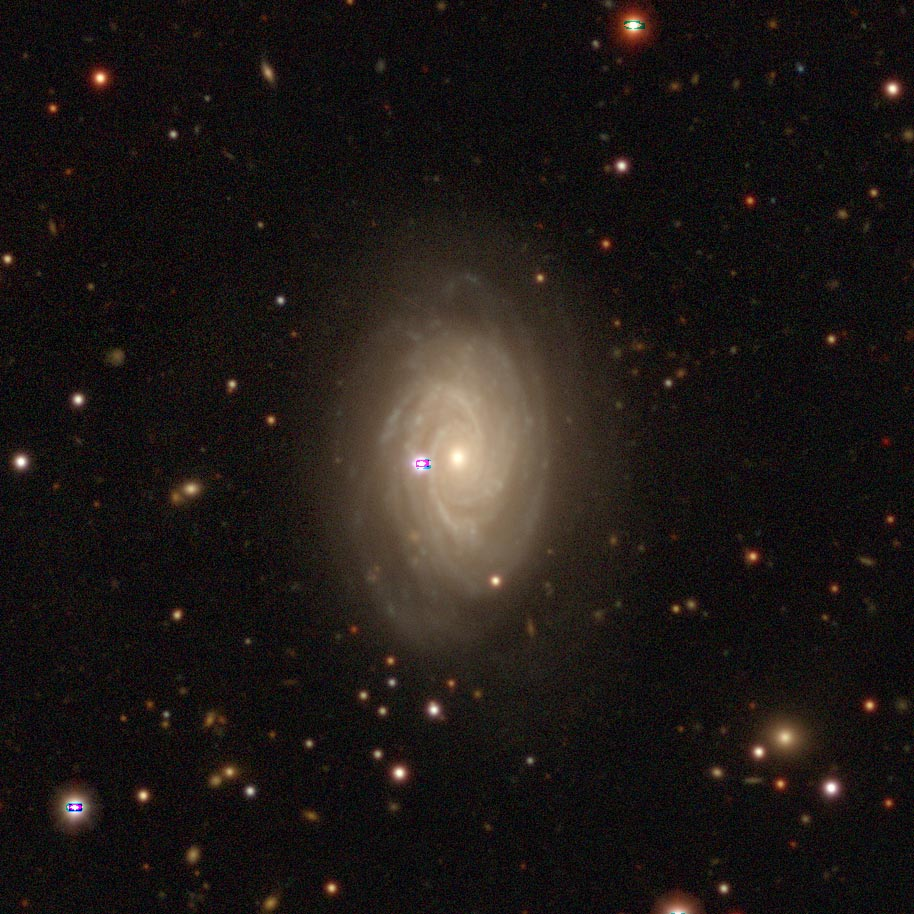
- NGC 1762 imaged by Legacy Surveys

Observation data (J2000 epoch)
- Constellation: Orion
- Right ascension: 05^{h} 03^{m} 37.0784^{s}
- Declination: +01° 34′ 24.113″
- Redshift: 0.015858±0.00000700
- Heliocentric radial velocity: 4,754±2 km/s
- Distance: 275.44 ± 22.19 Mly (84.450 ± 6.805 Mpc)
- Group or cluster: NGC 1762 group (LGG 120)
- Apparent magnitude (V): 13.35
- Magnitude (J): 10.488
- Magnitude (H): 9.804
- Magnitude (K): 9.517

Characteristics
- Type: SA(rs)c
- Size: ~149,200 ly (45.73 kpc) (estimated)
- Apparent size (V): 1.7′ × 1.1′

Other designations
- IRAS 05010+0130, 2MASX J05033701+0134239, UGC 3238, MCG +00-13-067, PGC 16654, CGCG 394-073

NGC 1762 is a spiral galaxy in the constellation of Orion. Its velocity with respect to the cosmic microwave background is 4,739±2 km/s, which corresponds to a Hubble distance of 228.0 ± 15.9 Mly (69.90 ± 4.89 Mpc). However, 10 non-redshift measurements give a farther mean distance of 275.44 ± 22.19 Mly (84.450 ± 6.805 Mpc). It was discovered by German-British astronomer William Herschel on 8 October 1785.

NGC 1762 has a possible active galactic nucleus, i.e. it has a compact region at the center of a galaxy that emits a significant amount of energy across the electromagnetic spectrum, with characteristics indicating that this luminosity is not produced by the stars.

== NGC 1762 group ==
NGC 1762 is a member the NGC 1762 group (also known as LGG 120), which contains at least 27 galaxies, including NGC 1590, NGC 1633, NGC 1642, NGC 1691, NGC 1713, NGC 1719, and IC 392.

== Supernova ==
One supernova has been observed in NGC 1762:

- SN 2002cy (type unknown, mag. 16.7) was discovered by South African amateur astronomer Berto Monard on 8 May 2002.
- iPTF13dge (likely Type Ia supernova, mag. 19.5) was discovered by Palomar Transient Factory on 5 Sep 2013. It is not detected by Australia Telescope Compact Array and Neil Gehrels Swift Observatory.

== See also ==
- List of NGC objects (1001–2000)
