= NGC 2927 =

Galaxy in the constellation Leo

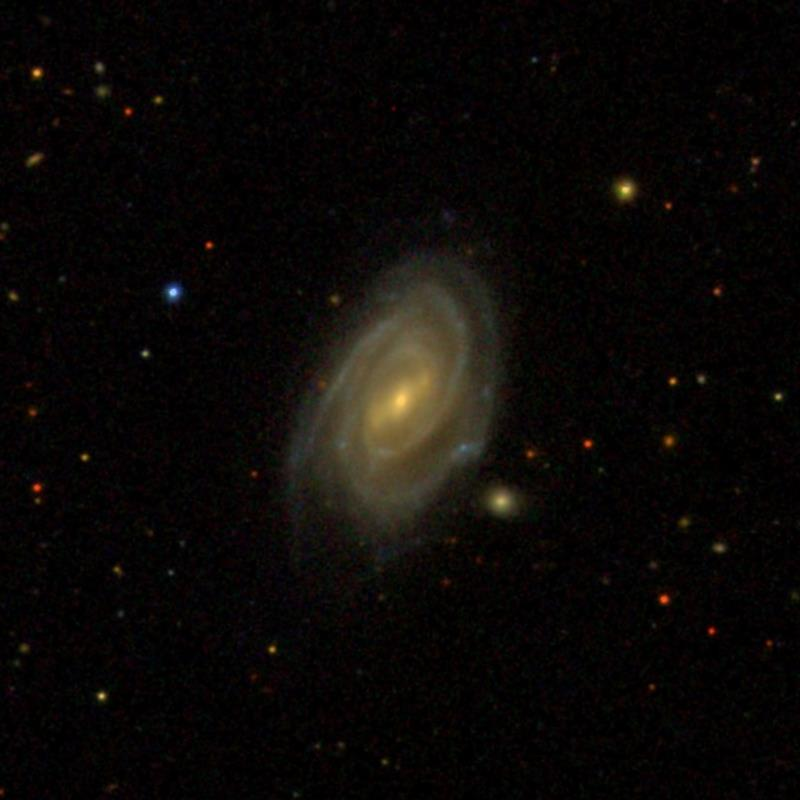
- NGC 2927 imaged by SDSS

Observation data (J2000 epoch)
- Constellation: Leo
- Right ascension: 09^{h} 37^{m} 15.2100^{s}
- Declination: +23° 35′ 26.209″
- Redshift: 0.025147
- Heliocentric radial velocity: 7539 ± 2 km/s
- Distance: 393.56 ± 2.88 Mly (120.667 ± 0.882 Mpc)
- Apparent magnitude (V): 12.9

Characteristics
- Type: SAB(rs)b
- Size: ~229,000 ly (70.20 kpc) (estimated)
- Apparent size (V): 1.3′ × 1.0′

Other designations
- IRAS F09343+2349, 2MASX J09371521+2335261, UGC 5122, MCG +04-23-016, PGC 27385, CGCG 122-032

NGC 2927 is a large barred spiral galaxy in the constellation of Leo. Its velocity with respect to the cosmic microwave background is 7830 ± 20 km/s, which corresponds to a Hubble distance of 376.7 ± 26.4 Mly (115.49 ± 8.09 Mpc). In addition, three non-redshift measurements give a distance of 393.56 ± 2.88 Mly (120.667 ± 0.882 Mpc). The galaxy was discovered by German astronomer Heinrich d'Arrest on 21 February 1863.

The SIMBAD database lists NGC 2927 as a radio galaxy, i.e. it has giant regions of radio emission extending well beyond its visible structure.

NGC 2927 forms a pair of galaxies with NGC 2929.

== Supernova ==
One supernova has been observed in NGC 2927.

- SN 2023uvg (Type Ic, mag. 18.7389) was discovered by the Automatic Learning for the Rapid Classification of Events (ALeRCE) on 13 October 2023.

== See also ==
- List of NGC objects (2001–3000)
