= NGC 819 =

Galaxy in the constellation Triangulum

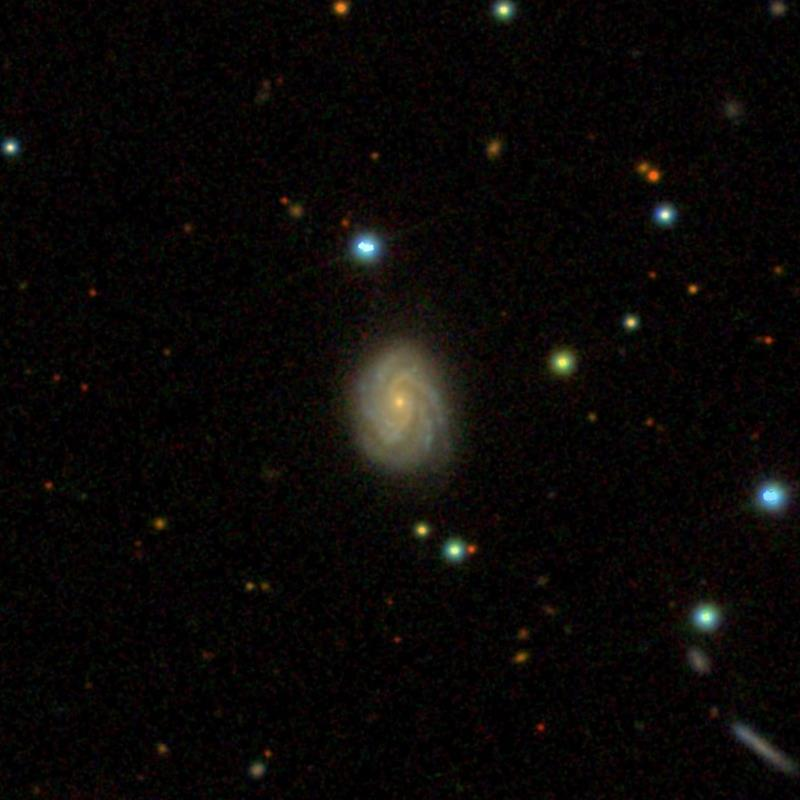
- NGC 819 (SDSS)

Observation data (J2000.0 epoch)
- Constellation: Triangulum
- Right ascension: 02^{h} 08^{m} 34.40^{s}
- Declination: +29° 14′ 03.00″
- Redshift: 0.021935
- Heliocentric radial velocity: 6576 ± 10 km/s
- Distance: 302 Mly
- Apparent magnitude (V): 13.40
- Apparent magnitude (B): 14.30

Characteristics
- Type: S?
- Apparent size (V): 0.6 x 0.4

Other designations
- IRAS 02056+2859, UGC 1632, PGC 8174, CGCG 504-017

NGC 819 is a spiral galaxy approximately 302 million light-years away from Earth in the constellation of Triangulum. It forms a visual pair with the galaxy NGC 816 5.7' WNW.

== Discovery ==
NGC 819 was discovered by German astronomer Heinrich Louis d'Arrest on September 20, 1865 with the 11-inch refractor at Copenhagen. Édouard Stephan independently found the galaxy again on September 15, 1871 with the 31" reflector at Marseille Observatory.

== Supernovae ==
Four supernovae have been observed in NGC 819:

- SN 2007hb (Type Ib/c, mag. 19.5) was discovered by Nearby Supernova Factory on August 24, 2007. It was located at RA 02^{h} 08^{m} 34.0^{s}, DEC +29° 14′ 14″, J2000.0.
- SN 2016hkn (Type II, mag. 17.2) was discovered by Paolo Campaner on October 22, 2016. It was located at RA 02^{h} 08^{m} 34.23^{s}, DEC +29° 14′ 11.1″.
- SN 2020mbe (Type Ic, mag. 18.6) was discovered by Gaia Photometric Science Alerts on January 10, 2020.
- SN 2026fau (Type II, mag. 18.5942) was discovered by the Zwicky Transient Facility on March 7, 2026.

== See also ==
- List of NGC objects (1–1000)
