= NGC 1719 =

Galaxy in the constellation Orion

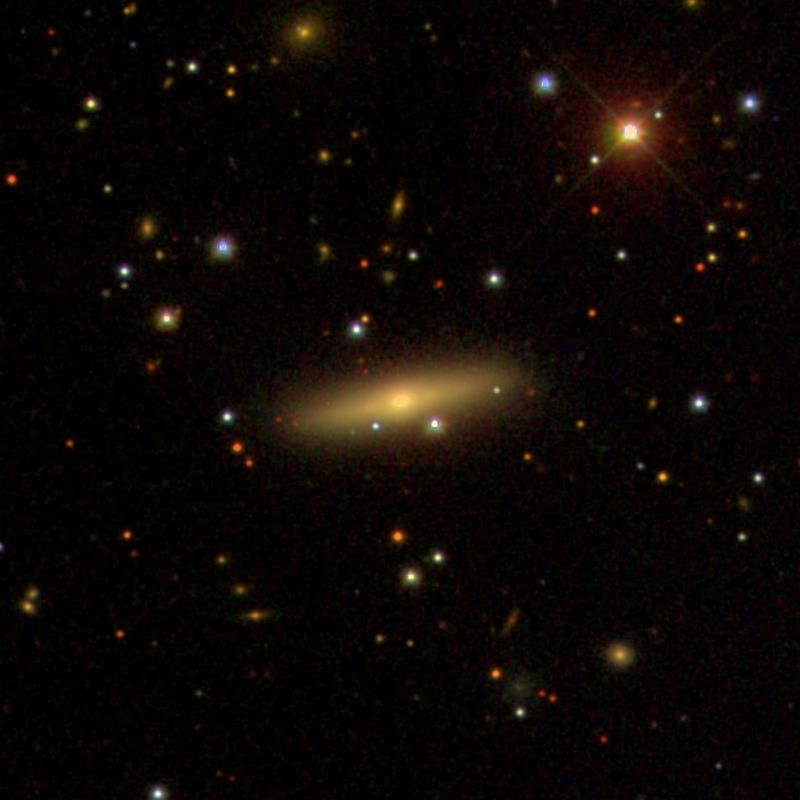
- A Sloan Digital Sky Survey (SDSS) image of NGC 1719

Observation data (J2000 epoch)
- Constellation: Orion
- Right ascension: 04^{h} 59^{m} 34.60^{s}
- Declination: −00° 15′ 38.0″
- Redshift: 0.013890 ± 9.00e-5
- Distance: 199 Mly (61.13 Mpc)
- Apparent magnitude (V): 13.6
- Magnitude (J): 10.639
- Magnitude (H): 9.963
- Magnitude (K): 9.716

Characteristics
- Type: Sa? edge-on
- Size: 90,000 ly
- Apparent size (V): 1.096′ × 0.309′
- Notable features: Emission-Line Galaxy

Other designations
- NGC 1719, UGC 03226, MCG +00-13-060, CGCG 394-063, 0457.0-0020

NGC 1719 is an edge-on spiral galaxy located around 199 million light-years away in the constellation Orion. It was discovered on November 23, 1827 by the english astronomer John Herschel, and it has a diameter around 90,000 light-years. NGC 1719 is not known to have much star-formation, and it is not known to have an active galactic nucleus.

== NGC 1762 group ==
NGC 1719 is a member the NGC 1762 group (also known as LGG 120), which contains at least 27 galaxies, including NGC 1590, NGC 1633, NGC 1642, NGC 1691, NGC 1713, NGC 1762, and IC 392.
