= NGC 358 =

Open cluster in the constellation Cassiopeia

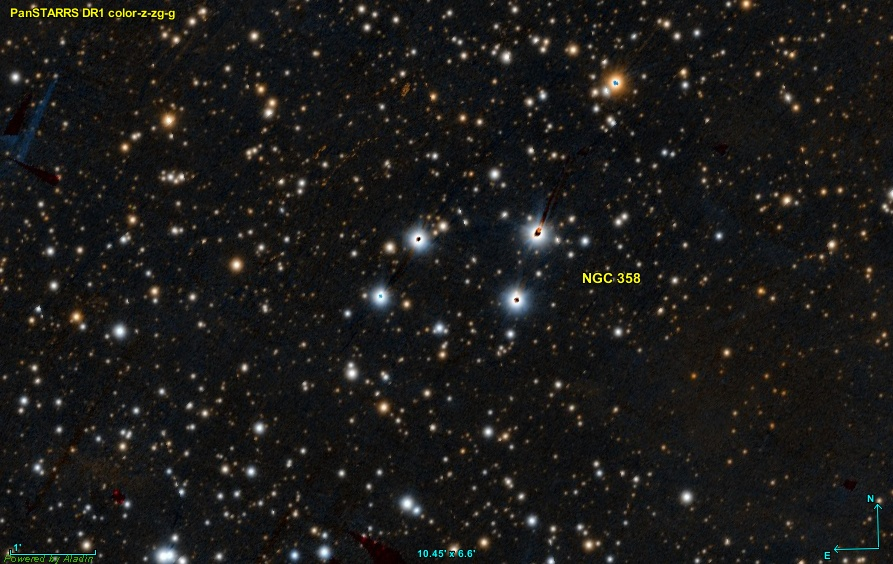
- NGC 358 with PanSTARRS

Observation data (J2000.0 epoch)
- Right ascension: 01^{h} 05^{m} 11.00^{s}
- Declination: +62° 01′ 18.0″
- Distance: 1700 ± 300
- Apparent dimensions (V): 2.5′

Physical characteristics

Associations
- Constellation: Cassiopeia

NGC 358 is an asterism of four stars in the constellation of Cassiopeia. Two of the members were found to have a similar distance of roughly 1700 light years with Hipparcos data, although the other two did not have well-constrained distances, so its exact nature was uncertain.

Gaia DR3 data shows that the two members TYC 4021-519-1 and TYC 4021-575-1 are not associated due to their very different proper motion and radial velocity. The distance remains remarkable similar for both stars from the Gaia parallax. The other two stars have larger distances.

The asterism was discovered on February 4, 1865, by the German-Danish astronomer Heinrich Louis d'Arrest.

== Individual Objects ==
Component	Right Ascension	Declination	Distance (parsec)	Brightness	Reference
TYC 4021-519-1	01^{h} 05^{m} 03.5^{s}	+62° 01′ 41.4″	537 ± 5	11.2	SIMBAD; Gaia DR3
TYC 4021-575-1; CMC 600551	01^{h} 05^{m} 15.4^{s}	+62° 01′ 37.1″	544 ± 4	11.8	Gaia DR3
TYC 4021-649-1	01^{h} 05^{m} 05.7^{s}	+62° 00′ 54.5″	947 ± 14	11.6	Gaia DR3
USNO-A2.0 1500-01120974	01^{h} 05^{m} 19^{s}	+62° 00′ 57″	3238+144 −131	12.5	Gaia DR3 USNO-A2.0
