= NGC 1 =

Galaxy in the constellation Pegasus

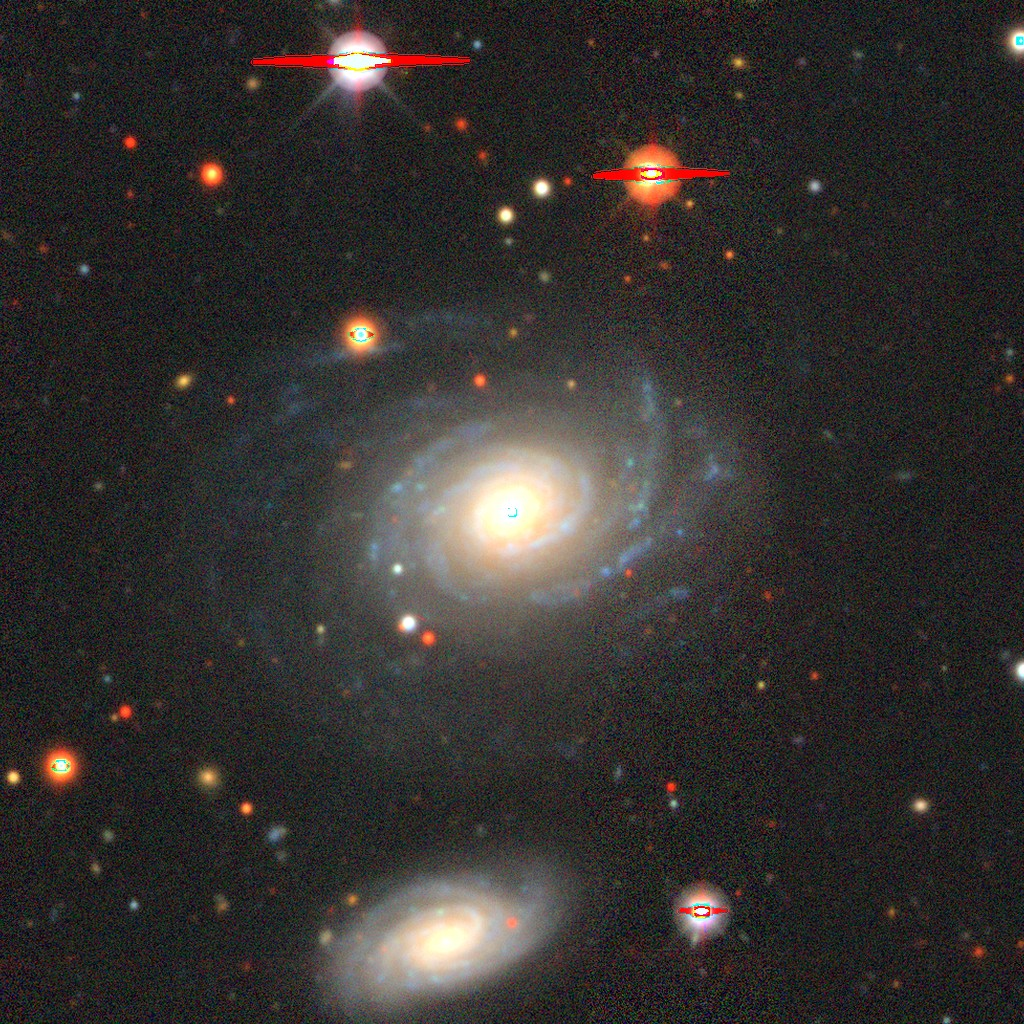
- NGC 1 imaged by DESI Legacy Surveys

Observation data (J2000 epoch)
- Constellation: Pegasus
- Right ascension: 00^{h} 07^{m} 15.8672^{s}
- Declination: +27° 42′ 28.911″
- Redshift: 0.015177 ± 0.000002
- Heliocentric radial velocity: 4550 ± 1 km/s
- Galactocentric velocity: 4723 ± 7 km/s
- Distance: 184.69 ± 8.84 Mly (56.627 ± 2.710 Mpc)
- Group or cluster: NGC 23 Group (LGG 2)
- Apparent magnitude (V): 13.65
- Apparent magnitude (B): 13.6
- Absolute magnitude (V): -22.08

Characteristics
- Type: SA(s)b?
- Size: ~96,700 ly (29.65 kpc) (estimated)
- Apparent size (V): 1.6′ × 1.2′

Other designations
- Holm 2A, IRAS 00047+2725, UGC 57, MCG +04-01-025, PGC 564, CGCG 477-054

NGC 1 is an intermediate spiral galaxy of the morphological type Sbc, located in the constellation of Pegasus. It was discovered on 30 September 1861 by Heinrich d'Arrest.

== Observation history ==
Heinrich d'Arrest discovered NGC 1 on 30 Sep 1861 while testing the 11-inch f/17.5 Merz refractor of the Copenhagen Observatory. He missed nearby NGC 2. This was d'Arrest's first deep sky discovery, though he was uncertain if his object was identical to h4 or h5 (both of which refer to NGC 16). His descriptions (combination of 4 observations) read "faint, small, round, 20", no concentration. In a straight line connecting two stars 11 and 14 mag." Herman Schultz observed NGC 1 three times in 1866 and 1868 with a 9.6-inch refractor at Uppsala and he also missed fainter NGC 2. The NGC 1 and 2 pair are not physically related. NGC 1 lies at a distance of about 200 million light-years (61 Mpc) with NGC 2 at roughly 320 million light-years (98 Mpc).

The initial observers missed NGC 2, which is much fainter. NGC 1 appears to be quite close to NGC 2, in reality however, the two objects are far apart and unrelated. NGC 2 was first observed as a "companion" of NGC 1 by Lawrence Parsons.

== Properties ==
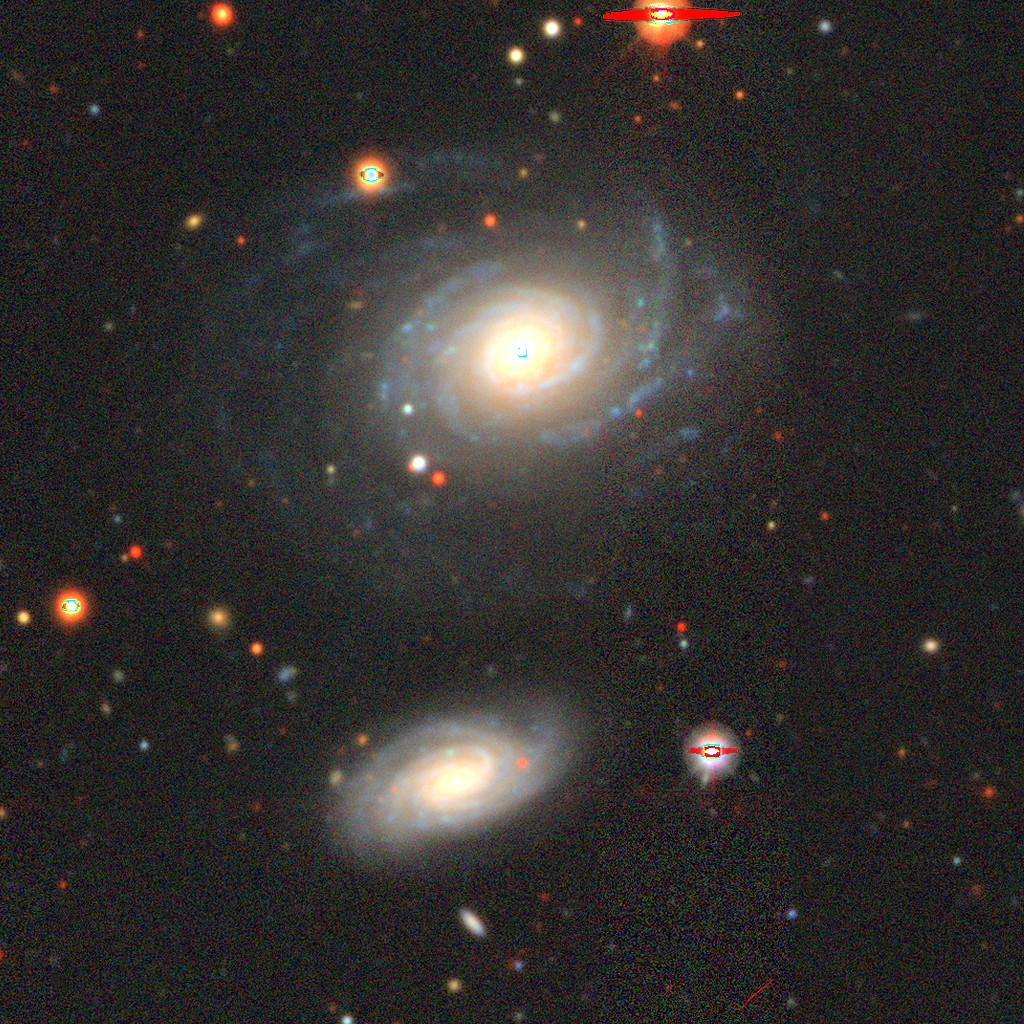
NGC 1 and NGC 2 as an optical double

At an estimated 140,000 light-years in diameter, NGC 1 is roughly the same size as our galaxy, the Milky Way, which is believed to be approximately 160,000 light-years across. Although its apparent magnitude of 13.65 makes the galaxy appear too faint to see with the naked eye, its absolute magnitude of -22.08 makes NGC 1 two to three times more luminous than our home galaxy. The galaxy is 4.0 Mly away from the 80,000 light-years wide galaxy UGC 69, its nearest major neighbor.

NGC 1 has a visual size of 1.6' × 1.2'. Being classified as a SABbc class galaxy using the Hubble sequence and the De Vaucouleurs system as an extension, NGC 1 is a spiral galaxy with the presence of a weak nuclear bar and loosely wound arms. Although the central galaxy is only about 90,000 light-years across, a large, diffuse arm extends eastwards from it, possibly from a past merger.

Based on its redshift of approximately 0.015177 and thus recessional velocity of 4450 km/s, the distance of the galaxy from the Solar System can be calculated using Hubble's law. Using current observation data, this places the galaxy at approximately 210 to 215 million light-years from Earth, which is in good agreement with redshift-independent distance estimates of 175 to 245 million light years. An opposing measurement of the galaxy's recessional velocity of 2215 km/s would place the galaxy only about 100 million light-years away. However, this is regarded unlikely by most astronomers and believed to be a misattributed value for a different galaxy.

== Listing in astronomical catalogues ==
After being logged as the first object in the General Catalogue, the galaxy is also the first object to be listed in the catalogue's successor, the New General Catalogue. With an original right ascension of 00^{h} 00^{m} 4^{s} at the time of the catalog's compilation (epoch 1860), this object had the lowest right ascension of all the objects in the catalog, making it the first listing in the New General Catalogue as the objects were arranged by right ascension. Since then, the coordinates have shifted, and this object no longer has the lowest right ascension of all the NGC objects.

== NGC 23 group ==
NGC 1 is part of the NGC 23 group (also known as LGG 2) that includes at least 6 other galaxies: NGC 23, NGC 26, UGC 69, UGC 79, UGC 110, and UGC 127.

== See also ==
- Pegasus (constellation)
- List of NGC objects (1–1000)
- List of NGC objects
- Spiral galaxy
