= NGC 23 =

Galaxy in the constellation Pegasus

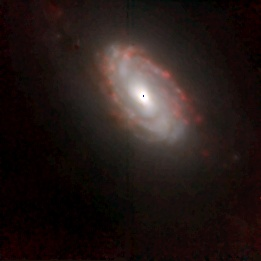
- NGC 23 imaged by the Hubble Space Telescope

Observation data (J2000 epoch)
- Constellation: Pegasus
- Right ascension: 00^{h} 09^{m} 53.411^{s}
- Declination: +25° 55′ 25.46″
- Redshift: 0.015054
- Heliocentric radial velocity: 4,568 km/s
- Distance: 173.5 Mly (53.21 Mpc)
- Group or cluster: NGC 23 Group (LGG 2)
- Apparent magnitude (V): 11.9 mag
- Absolute magnitude (V): -21.85

Characteristics
- Type: SBb
- Apparent size (V): 2.1′ × 1.3′

Other designations
- UGC 89, Mrk 545, PGC 698, GC 9.

NGC 23 is a spiral galaxy located in the northern constellation of Pegasus, around 173.5 megalight-years distant from the Milky Way. It was discovered by William Herschel on 10 September 1784. In the Webb Society Deep-Sky Observer's Handbook, the visual appearance of NGC 23 is described as follows:

Bright, extended ellipse; a bright nuclear structure is noticeably elongated; two weak spiral enhancements emerge from opposite sides of the nucleus, one curving towards a bright star attached on the south end. The galaxy is likely interacting with NGC 9.

The shape of this galaxy is described by its morphological classification of SBb, which indicates it is a barred spiral (SB) with spiral arms that are moderately tightly wound (b). It is a luminous infrared galaxy with star-forming clumps.

== NGC 23 group ==
NGC 23 is part of the NGC 23 group (also known as LGG 2) that includes at least 6 other galaxies: NGC 1, NGC 26, UGC 69, UGC 79, UGC 110, and UGC 127.

== Supernova ==
One supernova has been observed in NGC 23. SN 1955C (type unknown, mag. 16) was discovered by Allan Sandage in September 1958 using the Hale Telescope. On a photographic plate taken 23 October 1955 (three years prior), a bright star with a visual magnitude around 16 was located 10″ to the north and 10″ east of the galactic center. The star was not visible on a photograph taken 60 days prior.

== See also ==
- NGC
- List of NGC objects (1–1000)
- List of NGC objects
- Galaxy
