= NGC 26 =

Spiral galaxy in the constellation Pegasus

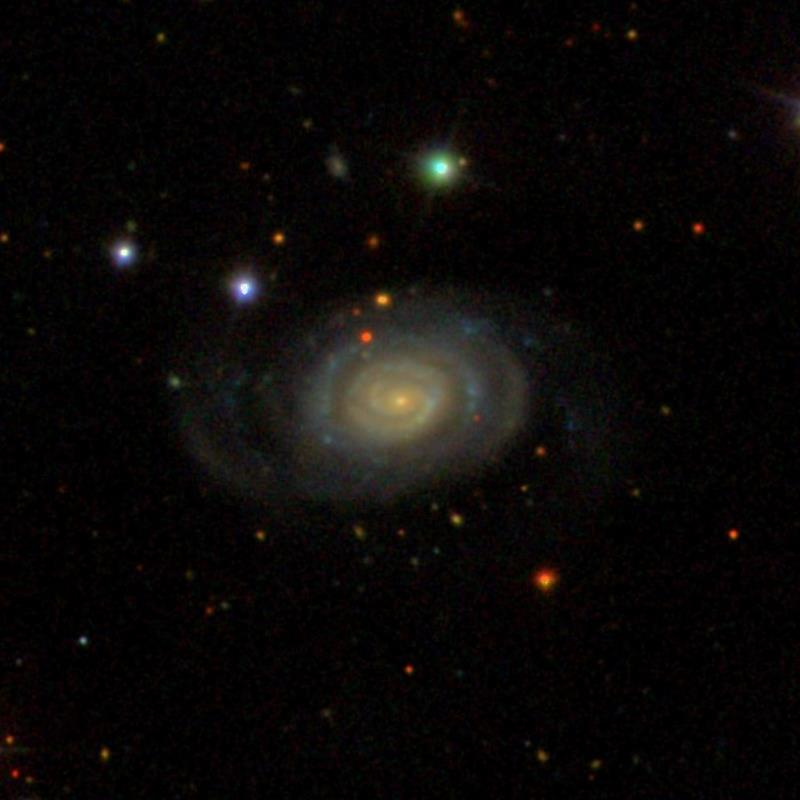
- SDSS image of NGC 26

Observation data (J2000 epoch)
- Constellation: Pegasus
- Right ascension: 00^{h} 10^{m} 25.8591^{s}
- Declination: +25° 49′ 54.982″
- Redshift: 0.015321
- Heliocentric radial velocity: 4593 ± 1 km/s
- Distance: 204.5 ± 14.4 Mly (62.71 ± 4.40 Mpc)
- Group or cluster: NGC 23 Group (LGG 2)
- Apparent magnitude (V): 13.6
- Absolute magnitude (V): -20.23

Characteristics
- Type: SA(rs)ab
- Apparent size (V): 2.25′ × 1.25′

Other designations
- IRAS 00078+2533, UGC 94, MCG +04-01-034, PGC 732, CGCG 477-064

NGC 26 is a spiral galaxy in the constellation Pegasus. It was discovered on 14 September 1865 by Heinrich Louis d'Arrest.

== NGC 23 group ==
NGC 26 is part of the NGC 23 group (also known as LGG 2) that includes at least 6 other galaxies: NGC 1, NGC 23, UGC 69, UGC 79, UGC 110, and UGC 127.

== Gallery ==
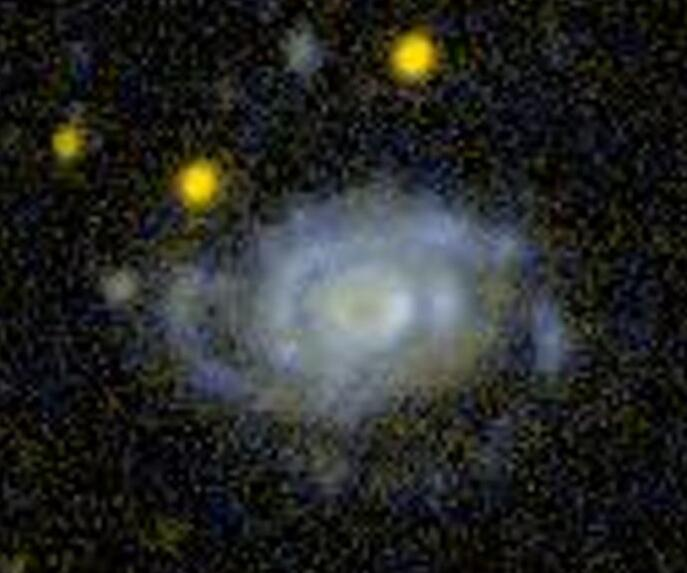
GALEX (ultraviolet) image of NGC 26.

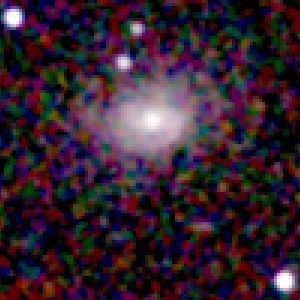
The galaxy NGC 26 imaged by 2MASS.
