= NGC 2 =

Galaxy in the constellation Pegasus

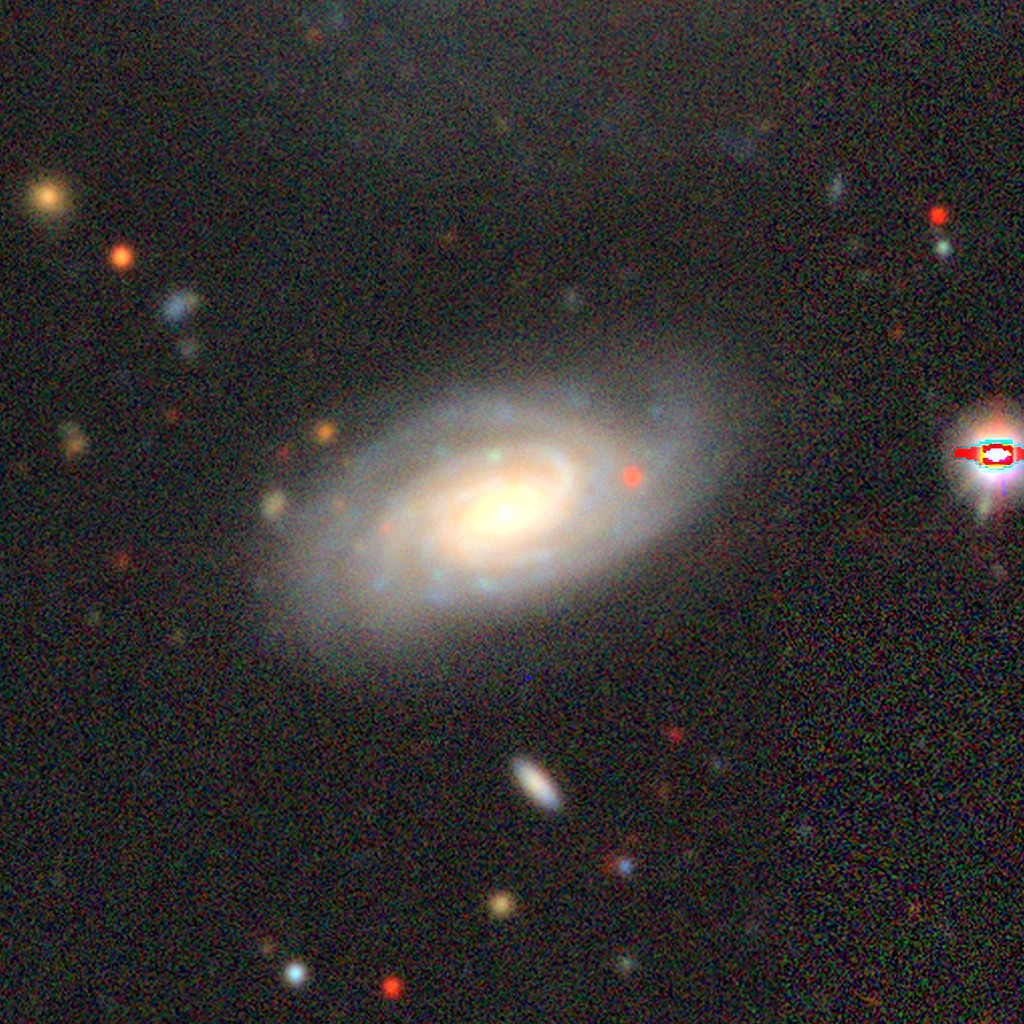
- NGC 2 by the DESI Legacy Surveys

Observation data (J2000 epoch)
- Constellation: Pegasus
- Right ascension: 00^{h} 07^{m} 17.1^{s}
- Declination: +27° 40′ 42″
- Redshift: 0.025214
- Heliocentric radial velocity: 7559 km/s
- Galactocentric velocity: 7720 km/s
- Distance: 305 ± 10 Mly (93.738 ± 3.28 Mpc)
- Apparent magnitude (V): +15.0
- Absolute magnitude (V): -22.58

Characteristics
- Type: Sab
- Size: ~106,700 ly (32.72 kpc) (estimated)
- Apparent size (V): 1′.0 × 0′.6
- Notable features: -

Other designations
- GC 6246, MCG+04-01-026, UGC 59, PGC 567

NGC 2 is an intermediate spiral galaxy with the morphological type of Sab, located in the constellation of Pegasus. NGC 2 was discovered by Lawrence Parsons, 4th Earl of Rosse on 20 August 1873.

== Observational History ==
NGC 2 was first observed by Lawrence Parsons, 4th Earl of Rosse on 24 August 1873, and was described as "very faint, small, south of GC 1."

== Properties ==
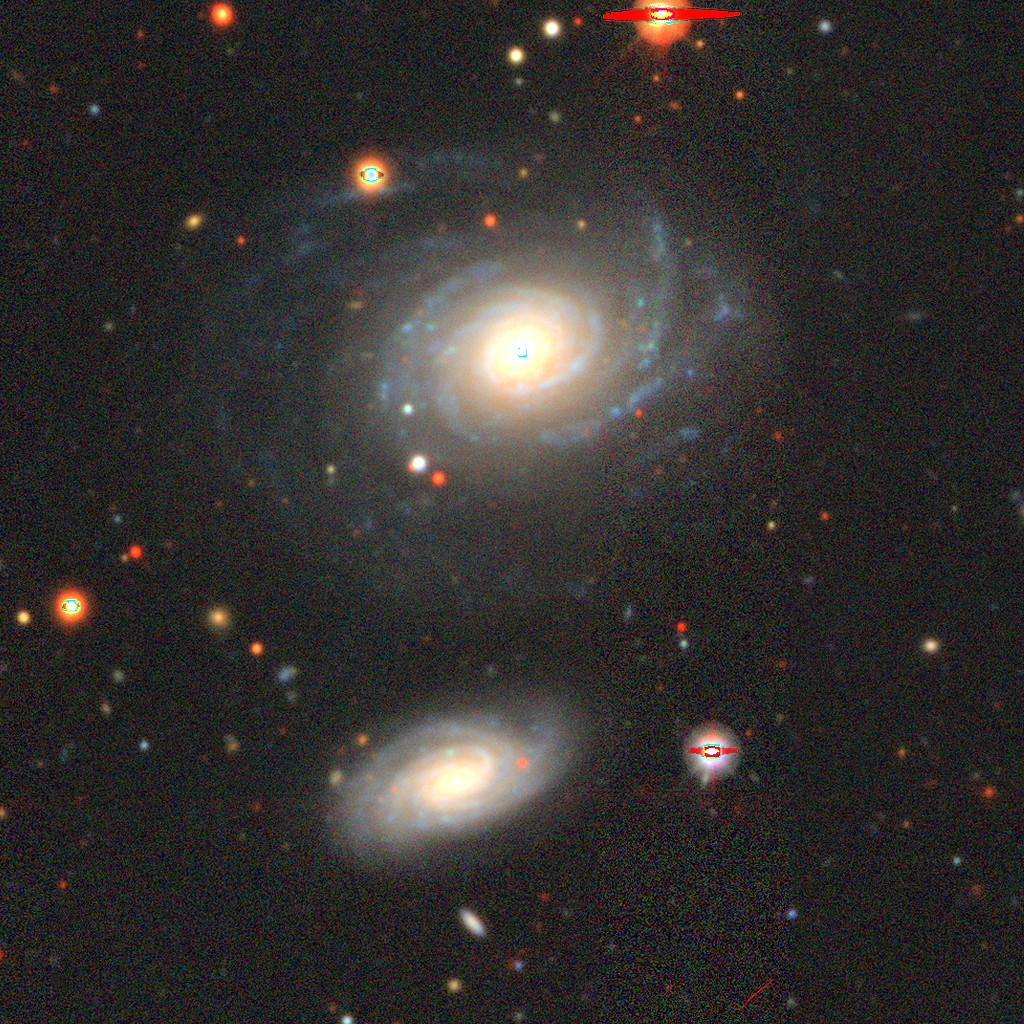
NGC 1 and NGC 2 as an optical double

NGC 2 is located about 345 million light-years from the Solar System, with a magnitude of +14.2, while the distance to NGC 1 is 210 million light-years. Although visually close in the sky, NGC 1 and NGC 2 are at very different distances; were they stars, they would be referred to as an "optical double" as seen from Earth.

AGC 102559, a spiral galaxy 60,000 light-years in diameter, is the closest galaxy to NGC 2, only 1.8 million light-years from it. Although it is quite close to NGC 1, the latter is closer and unrelated to NGC 2.

NGC 2 is a spiral galaxy with a diameter of about 60 thousand light-years, smaller than the size of the Milky Way.

== Listing in astronomical catalogues ==
NGC 2 is first cataloged as GC 6246, an addendum to Dreyer's 1877 Supplement to the General Catalogue of Nebulae And Clusters of Stars. The object is cataloged as UGC 59, PGC 567, CGCG 478–027, and MCG +04-01-026.

== Gallery ==
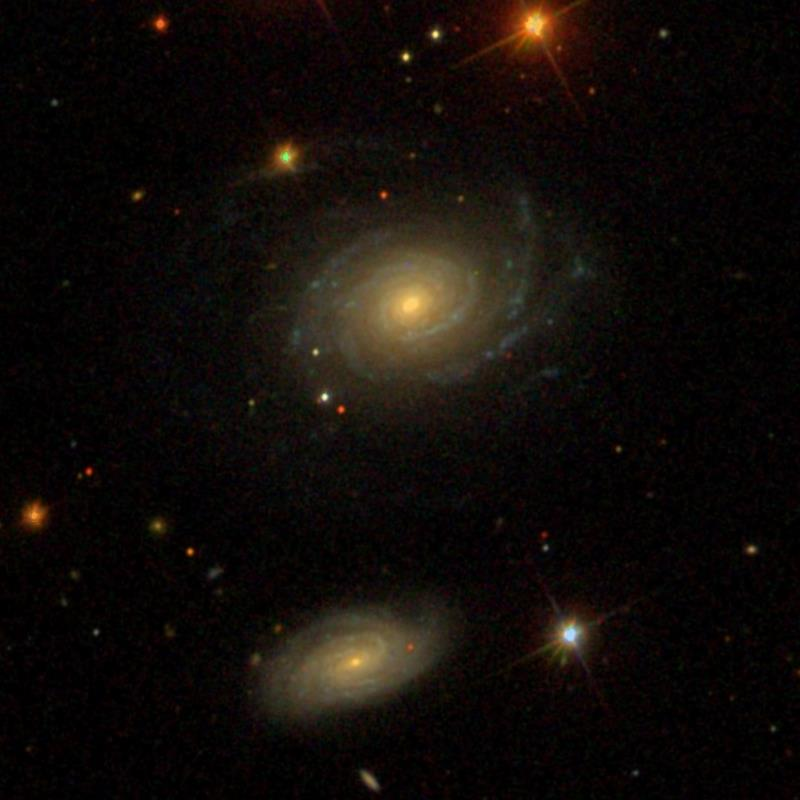
NGC 1 and NGC 2 by SDSS

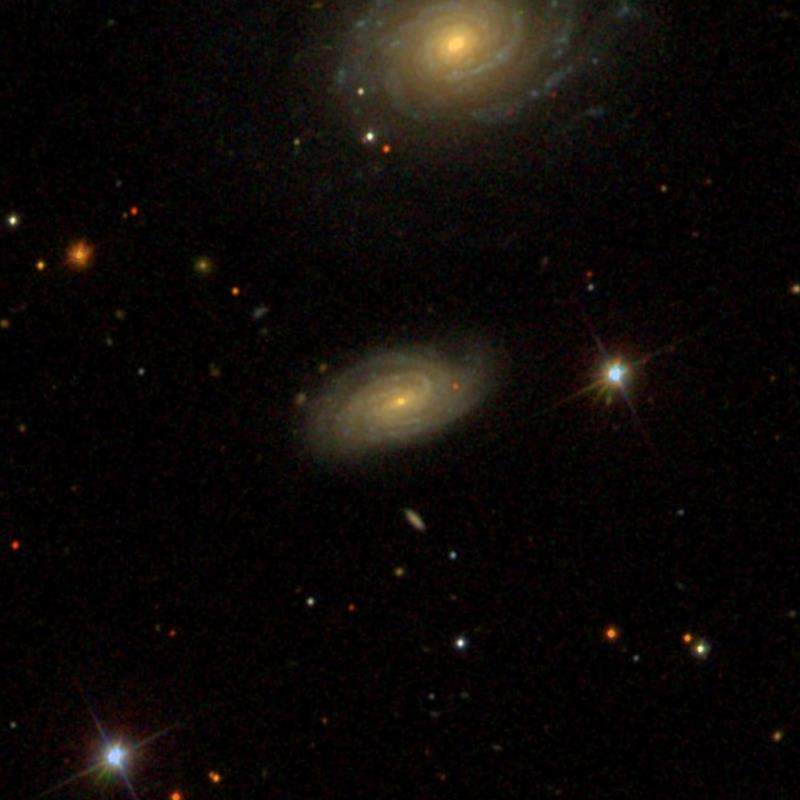
NGC 2 by SDSS

== See also ==
- List of NGC objects
