= NGC 1634 =

Lenticular galaxy located in the constellation Taurus

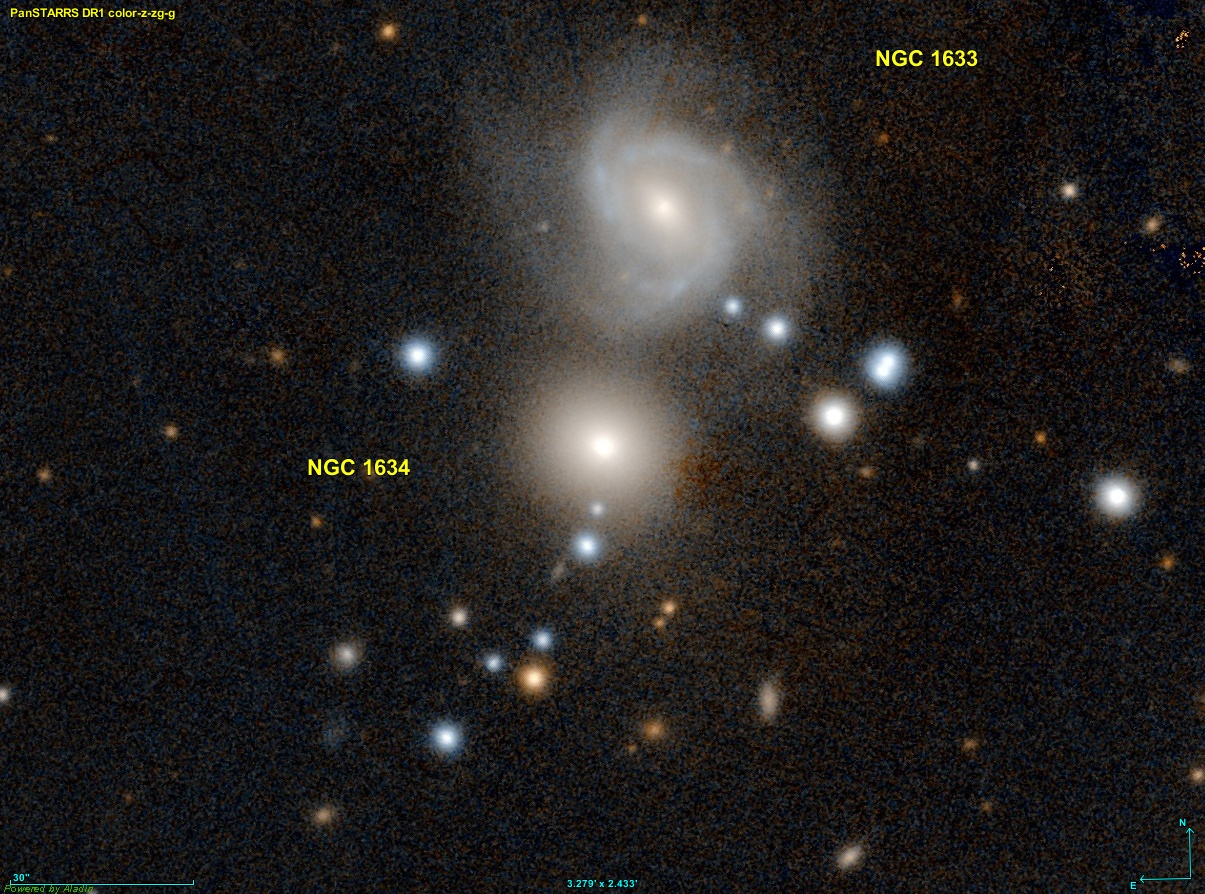
- The lenticular galaxy NGC 1634

Observation data (J2000 epoch)
- Constellation: Taurus
- Right ascension: 04h 40m 09.8s
- Declination: +07° 20′ 20″
- Distance: 64.21 Mpc (209,400,000 ly) ± 4.51 Mpc
- Apparent magnitude (V): 14.1
- Apparent magnitude (B): 15.1

Characteristics
- Type: Lenticular galaxy
- Size: 0.4′ × 0.3′

NGC 1634 is a small lenticular galaxy located in the constellation Taurus. It was discovered by the German-born British astronomer William Herschel in 1798.

== Characteristics ==
Its velocity relative to the cosmic microwave background is 4,354 kilometres per second (2,705 mi/s), which corresponds to a Hubble–Lemaître law distance of 64.2 ± 4.5 Mpc (209,000,000 ± 15,000,000 ly).

With a surface brightness of 11.80 mag/arcmin^{2}, NGC 1634 can be classified as a high surface brightness galaxy.

== See also ==
- List of NGC objects
