= NGC 500 =

Galaxy in the constellation Pisces

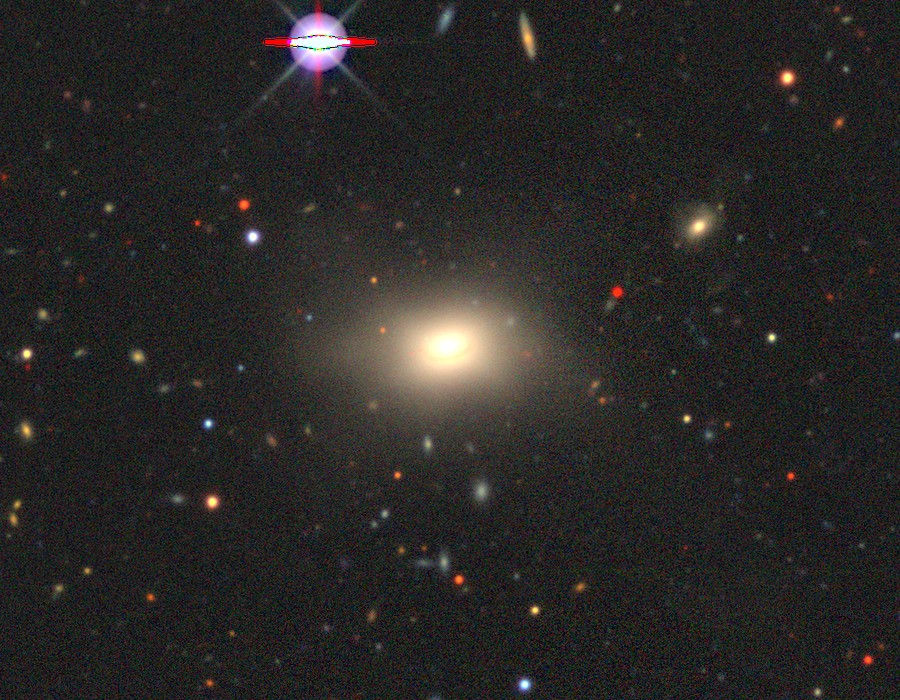
- NGC 500 imaged by Legacy Surveys

Observation data (J2000 epoch)
- Constellation: Pisces
- Right ascension: 01^{h} 22^{m} 39.4^{s}
- Declination: +05° 23′ 14″
- Redshift: 0.041128 ± 0.000080
- Heliocentric radial velocity: (12077 ± 24) km/s
- Distance: 551 Mly
- Apparent magnitude (V): 14.2

Characteristics
- Type: E-S0
- Apparent size (V): 0.8' × 0.6'

Other designations
- PGC 5013, GC 290, MGC +01-04-040, 2MASS J01223937+0523142

NGC 500 (also known as PGC 5013) is a type E-SO lenticular galaxy located in the constellation Pisces. It has an apparent size of .8 by .6 arcminutes and an apparent magnitude of 14.2. It was discovered in 1850 by Bindon Blood Stoney during his time at Birr Castle in Ireland.

One supernova has been observed in NGC 500: SN 1990A (type unknown, mag. 19) was discovered by Christian Pollas on 1 January 1990.

== See also ==
- Lenticular galaxy
- List of NGC objects (1–1000)
- Pisces (constellation)
