= NGC 488 =

Spiral galaxy in the constellation Pisces

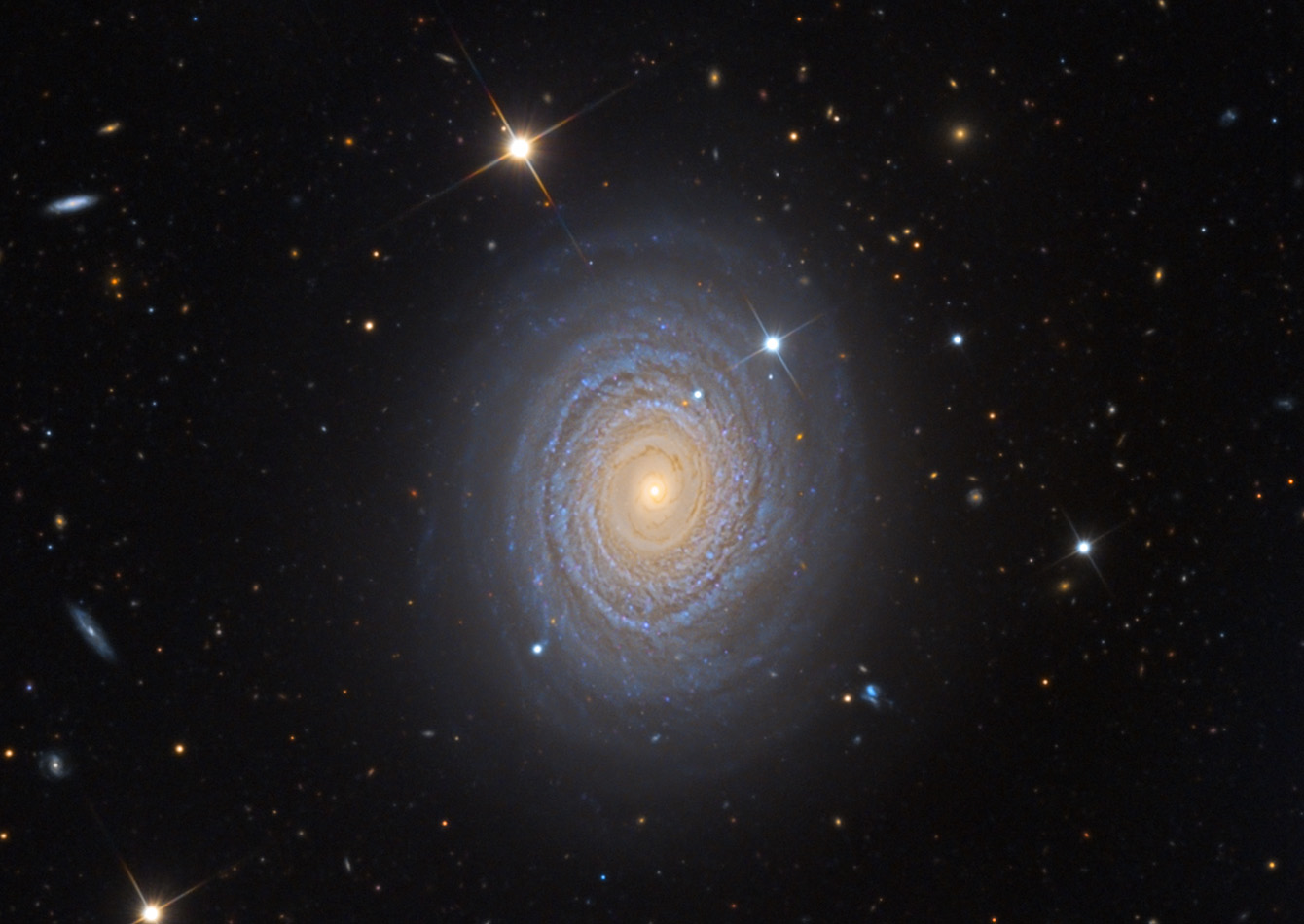
- NGC 488 imaged by the Mount Lemmon Observatory

Observation data (J2000 epoch)
- Constellation: Pisces
- Right ascension: 01^{h} 21^{m} 46.7904^{s}
- Declination: +05° 15′ 24.696″
- Redshift: 0.007579
- Heliocentric radial velocity: 2272 ± 1 km/s
- Distance: 98.3 ± 3.9 Mly (30.15 ± 1.2 Mpc)
- Apparent magnitude (V): 10.4

Characteristics
- Type: SA(r)b
- Size: ~185,800 ly (56.97 kpc) (estimated)
- Apparent size (V): 5.4′ × 3.9′
- Notable features: Prototype galaxy with multiple spiral arms

Other designations
- IRAS 01191+0459, UGC 907, MCG +01-04-033, PGC 4946, CGCG 411-033

NGC 488, also known as the Whirligig Galaxy, is a face-on spiral galaxy in the constellation Pisces. It was discovered by German-British astronomer William Herschel on 13 December 1784. It is at a distance of about 90 million light-years away from Earth. Its diameter is estimated to be ~185,800 Light Years (~52.7 Kpc). The galaxy has a large central bulge, and is considered a prototype galaxy with multiple spiral arms. Its arms are tightly wound. Star forming activity has been traced within the arms. The nucleus of NGC 488 has been found to be chemically decoupled, being twice as metal rich as the central bulge of the galaxy.

== NGC 488 Group ==
NGC 488, with the exception of its smaller companions, form the NGC 488 group; a relatively isolated galaxy group.

NGC 488 is part of a galaxy group known as NGC 488 Group or LGG 21. It has at least 7 members, which are NGC 488, NGC 485, NGC 490, UGC 942, UGC 882, UGC 871 and UGC 888.

== Supernovae ==
Two supernovae have been observed in NGC 488:

- SN 1976G (type unknown, mag. 15) was discovered by Miklós Lovas on 21 October 1976. It was also independently discovered by Swiss astronomer Paul Wild on 23 October 1976.
- SN 2010eb (Type Ia, mag. 14.7) was discovered by Berto Monard on 12 June 2010.

== Gallery ==
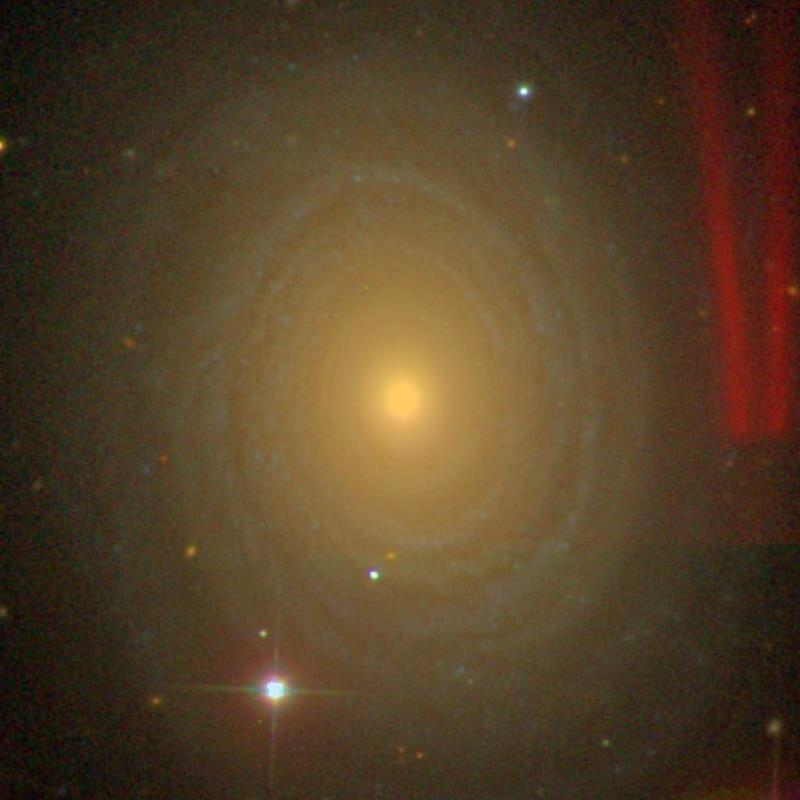
NGC 488 imaged by SDSS

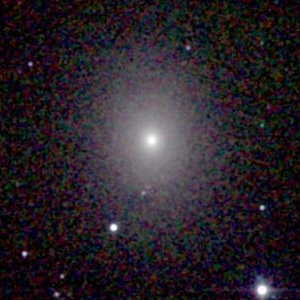
NGC 488 imaged by 2MASS

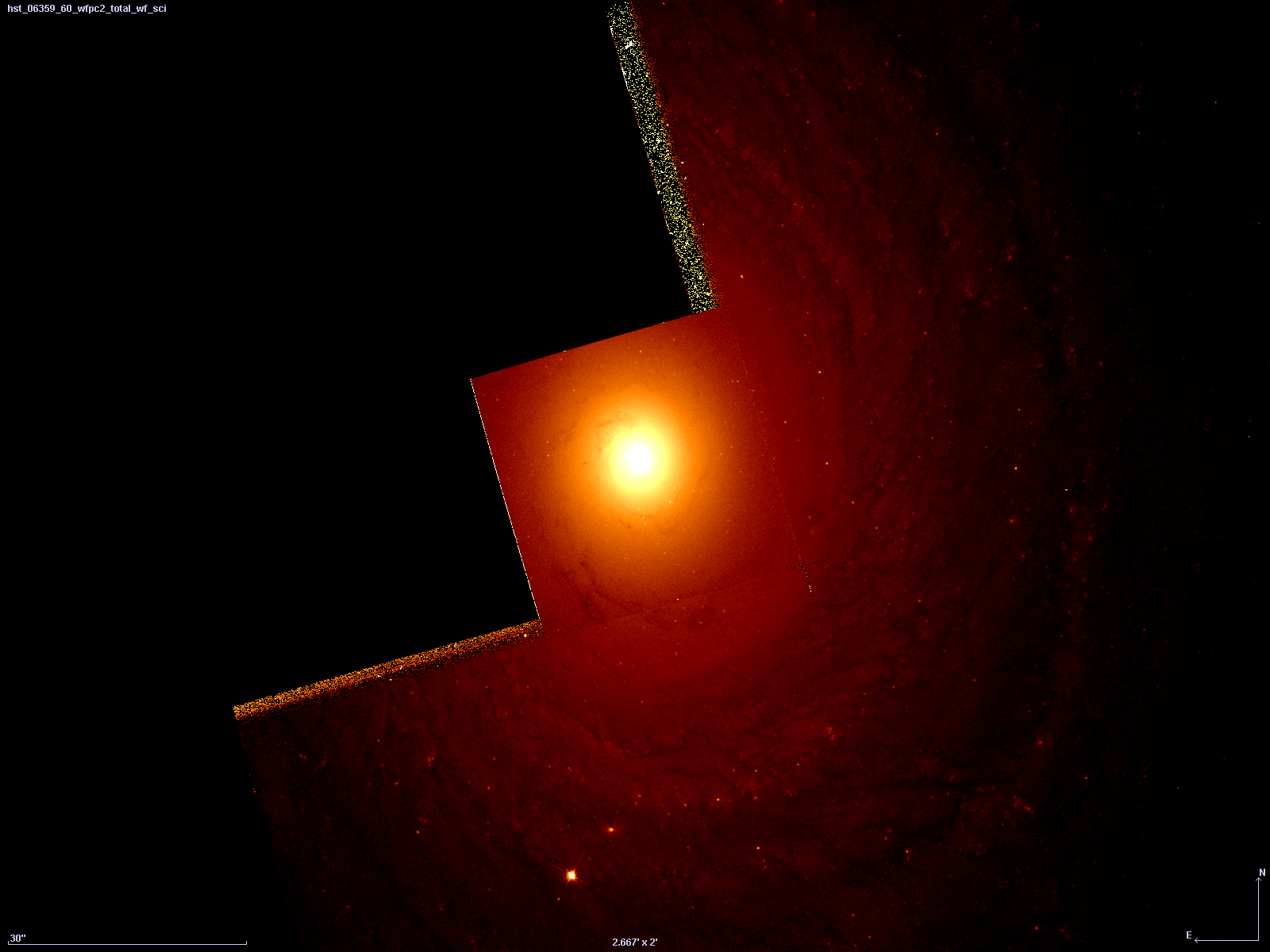
NGC 488 imaged by the Hubble Space Telescope

== See also ==
- List of NGC objects (1–1000)
