= Heinrich Louis d'Arrest =

German astronomer (1822–1875)

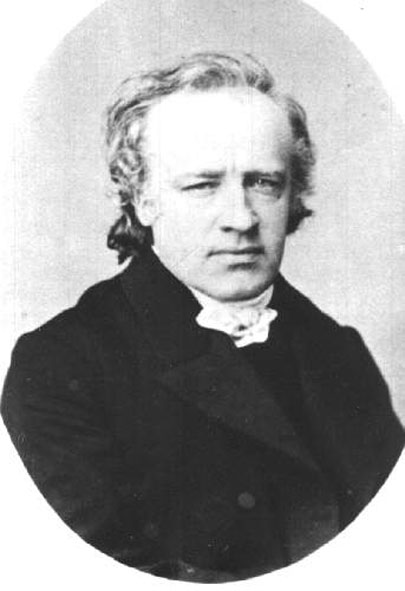
- Heinrich Louis d'Arrest
- Born: 13 August 1822; Berlin
- Died: 14 June 1875 (aged 52); Copenhagen
- Known for: Neptune
- Awards: Gold Medal of the Royal Astronomical Society; Lalande Prize (1844)
- Scientific career
- Doctoral students: Thorvald N. Thiele

Heinrich Louis d'Arrest (13 August 1822 – 14 June 1875; German pronunciation: [daˈʁɛ]) was a German astronomer, born in Berlin. His name is sometimes given as Heinrich Ludwig d'Arrest.

== Biography ==
While still a student at the University of Berlin, d'Arrest was party to Johann Gottfried Galle's search for Neptune. On 23 September 1846, he suggested that a recently drawn chart of the sky, in the region of Urbain Le Verrier's predicted location, could be compared with the current sky to seek the displacement characteristic of a planet, as opposed to a stationary star. Neptune was discovered that very night.

D'Arrest's later work at the Leipzig Observatory led him, in 1851, to the discovery of the comet named for him (formally designated 6P/d'Arrest). He also studied asteroids, discovering 76 Freia, nebulae, and galaxies, discovering NGC 1 in 1861 and NGC 26 and NGC 358 in 1865.

In 1864 D'Arrest made an unsuccessful search for Martian satellites, and posited an upper limit of 70 minutes of arc as the distance from Mars within which a moon should be sought.

He won the Gold Medal of the Royal Astronomical Society in 1875.

In 1857, he married Auguste Emilie Möbius, daughter of his then-supervisor, August Ferdinand Möbius. He died in Copenhagen, Denmark.

=== Honours ===
The crater D'Arrest on the Moon, the crater D'Arrest on the Martian satellite Phobos, as well as the asteroid 9133 d'Arrest were named after him.

== See also ==
- NGC 819
