= Field (heraldry) =

Background of a shield or flag

In heraldry, the background of the shield is called the field. The field is usually composed of one or more tinctures (colours or metals) or furs. The field may be divided or may consist of a variegated pattern.

In rare modern cases, the field or a subdivision thereof is not a tincture but is shown as a scene from a landscape, or, in the case of the 329th Fighter Group of the United States Air Force, blazoned as the sky proper. Landscape fields are regarded by many heralds as unheraldic and debased, as they defy the heraldic ideal of simple, boldly-coloured images, and they cannot be consistently drawn from blazon.

The arms of the Inveraray and District Community Council in Scotland have as a field In waves of the sea. The correct language of heraldry is very flexible and virtually any image may be blazoned in a correct manner; for example "sky proper" might be blazoned simply Azure or bleu celeste, whilst "waves of the sea" might be blazoned correctly as Azure, 3 bars undee argent which would provide 3 wavy thick white lines on a blue field.

== See also ==
- Division of the field
- Variation of the field
