= William Herschel =

German-British astronomer and composer (1738–1822)

William Herschel KH FRS
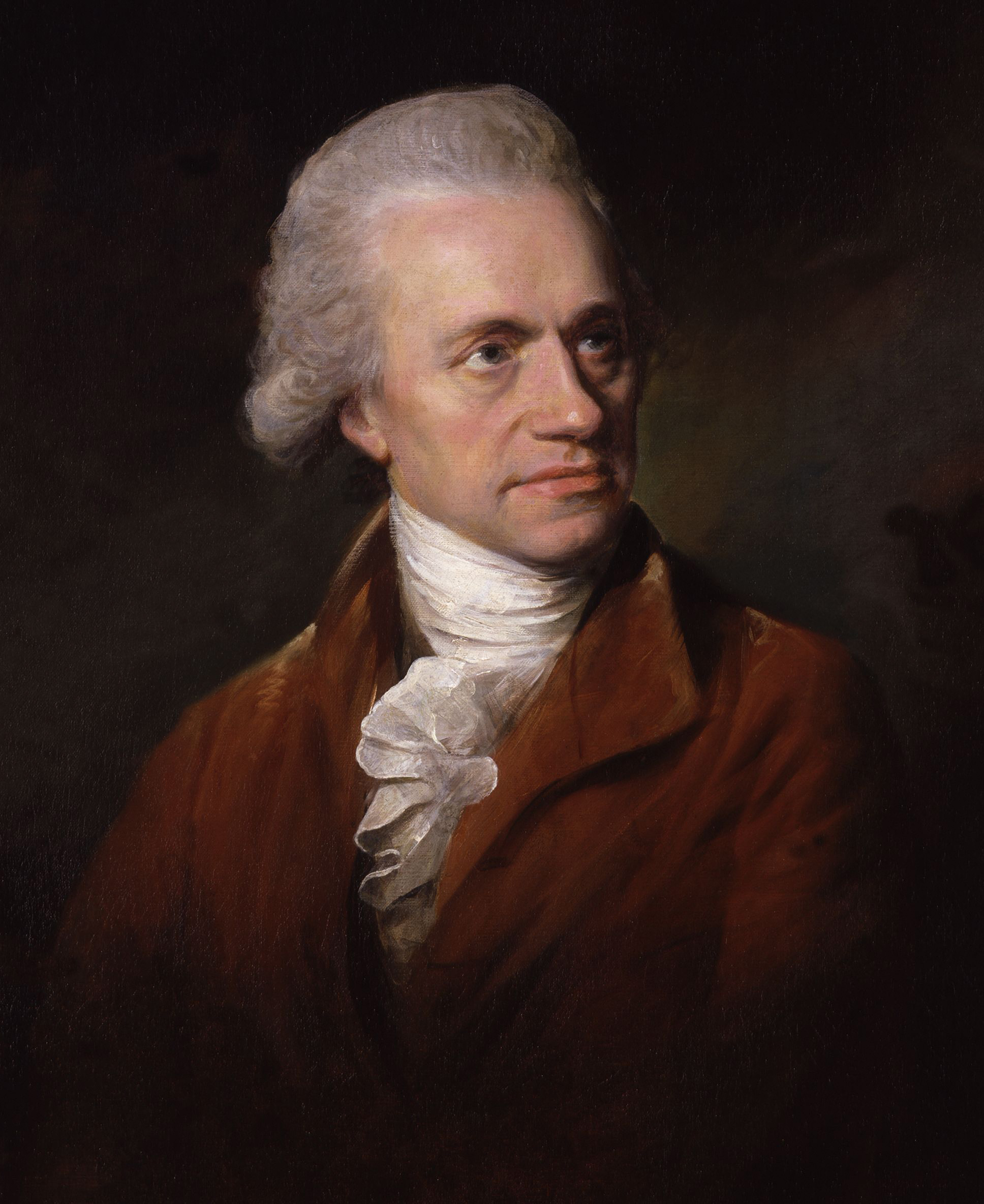
- Portrait of William Herschel (1785)
- Born: Friedrich Wilhelm Herschel; 15 November 1738; Hanover, Electorate of Hanover, Holy Roman Empire
- Died: 25 August 1822 (aged 83); Slough, England
- Resting place: St Laurence's Church, Upton, Slough
- Known for: Discovery of Uranus; Discovery of infrared radiation; Deep space surveys; First President of the Royal Astronomical Society
- Spouse: Mary Baldwin Herschel
- Children: John Herschel (son)
- Relatives: Caroline Herschel (sister)
- Awards: Copley Medal (1781)
- Scientific career
- Fields: Astronomy and music

Frederick William Herschel (/ˈhɜːrʃəl/ HUR-shəl; German: Friedrich Wilhelm Herschel [ˈfʁiːdʁɪç ˈvɪlhɛlm ˈhɛʁʃl̩]; 15 November 1738 – 25 August 1822), generally known as William Herschel, was a German–British astronomer and composer. He frequently collaborated with his younger sister and fellow astronomer Caroline Herschel. Born in the Electorate of Hanover, he followed his father into the military band of Hanover, before emigrating to Britain in 1757 at the age of 19.

Taking an interest in astronomy in 1766, Herschel constructed his first large telescope in 1774, after which he spent nine years carrying out sky surveys to investigate double stars. Herschel published catalogues of nebulae in 1802 (2,500 objects) and in 1820 (5,000 objects). The resolving power of the Herschel telescopes revealed that many objects called nebulae in the Messier catalogue were actually clusters of stars. On 13 March 1781 while making observations he made note of a new object in the constellation of Gemini. This would, after several weeks of verification and consultation with other astronomers, be confirmed to be a new planet, eventually given the name of Uranus. This was the first planet to be discovered since antiquity, and Herschel became famous overnight. As a result of this discovery, George III appointed him Court Astronomer. He was elected a Fellow of the Royal Society and grants were provided for the construction of new telescopes.

Herschel pioneered the use of astronomical spectrophotometry, using prisms and temperature measuring equipment to measure the wavelength distribution of stellar spectra. In the course of these investigations, Herschel discovered infrared radiation. Other work included an improved determination of the rotation period of Mars, the discovery that the Martian polar ice caps vary seasonally, the discovery of Titania and Oberon (moons of Uranus) and Enceladus and Mimas (moons of Saturn). Herschel was made a Knight of the Royal Guelphic Order in 1816. He was the first President of the Royal Astronomical Society when it was founded in 1820. He died in August 1822, and his work was continued by his only son, John Herschel.

== Early life and musical activities ==
Herschel was born in the Electorate of Hanover in Germany, then part of the Holy Roman Empire, one of ten children of Isaak Herschel and his wife, Anna Ilse Moritzen, of German Lutheran ancestry. His ancestors came from Pirna, in Saxony. Theories that they were Protestants from Bohemia have been questioned by Hamel as the surname Herschel already occurred a century earlier in the very same area in which the family lived.

Herschel's father was an oboist in the Hanover Military Band. In 1755 the Hanoverian Guards regiment, in whose band Wilhelm and his brother Jakob were engaged as oboists, was ordered to England. At the time the crowns of Great Britain and Hanover were united under King George II. As the threat of war with France loomed, the Hanoverian Guards were recalled from England to defend Hanover.

After they were defeated at the Battle of Hastenbeck, Herschel's father Isaak sent his two sons to seek refuge in England in late 1757. Although his older brother Jakob had received his dismissal from the Hanoverian Guards, Wilhelm was accused of desertion (for which he was pardoned by George III in 1782). Wilhelm, nineteen years old at this time, was a quick student of English. In England, he anglicised his name to Frederick William Herschel.

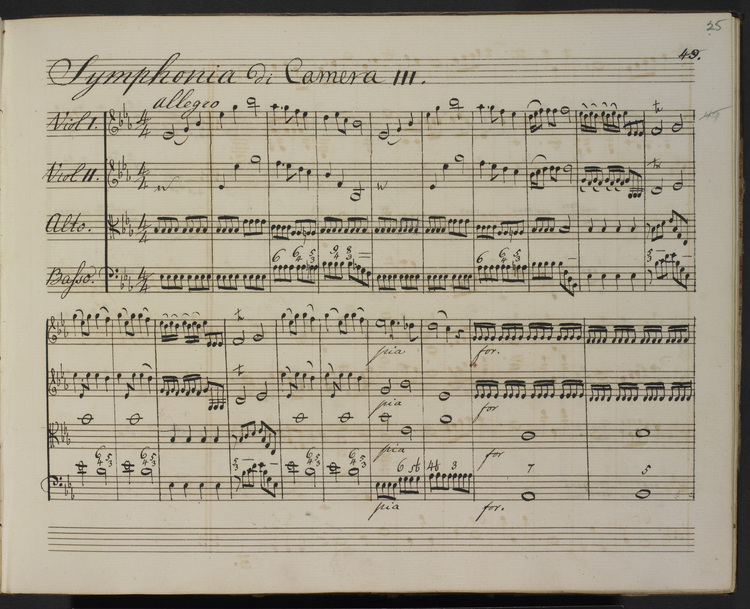
Original manuscript of Symphony No. 15 in E-flat major (1762)

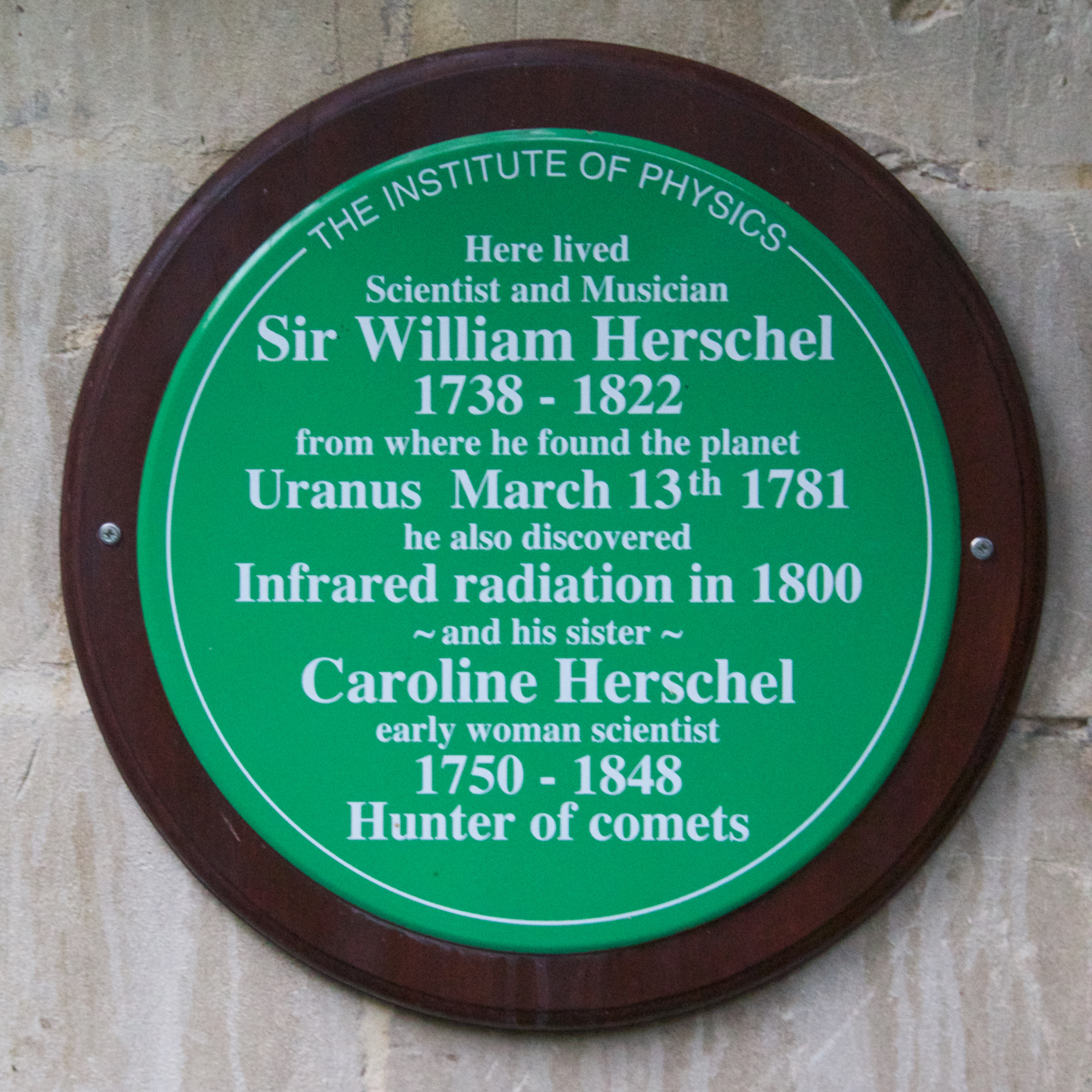
Plaque at the Herschel Museum of Astronomy, which was the family home at 19 New King Street, Bath

In addition to the oboe, he played the violin and harpsichord and later the organ. He composed numerous musical works, including 24 symphonies and many concertos, as well as some church music. Six of his symphonies were recorded in April 2002 by the London Mozart Players, conducted by Matthias Bamert (Chandos 10048).

He was head of the Durham Militia band from 1760 to 1761. Herschel moved to Sunderland in 1761; Charles Avison engaged him as the first violin and soloist for his Newcastle orchestra, where he played for one season. In "Sunderland in the County of Durh: apprill [sic] 20th 1761" he wrote his Symphony No. 8 in C Minor. He visited the home of Sir Ralph Milbanke at Halnaby Hall near Darlington in 1760, where he wrote two symphonies, as well as giving performances himself. After Newcastle, he moved to Leeds and Halifax where he was the first organist at St John the Baptist church (now Halifax Minster).

In 1766, Herschel became organist of the Octagon Chapel, Bath, a fashionable chapel in a well-known spa, in which city he was also Director of Public Concerts. He was appointed as the organist in 1766 and gave his introductory concert on 1 January 1767. As the organ was still incomplete, he showed off his versatility by performing his own compositions including a violin concerto, an oboe concerto, and a harpsichord sonata. On 4 October 1767, he performed on the organ for the official opening of the Octagon Chapel.

His sister Caroline arrived in England on 24 August 1772 to live with William in New King Street, Bath. The house they shared is now the location of the Herschel Museum of Astronomy. Herschel's brothers Dietrich, Alexander and Jakob also appeared as musicians of Bath. In 1780, Herschel was appointed director of the Bath orchestra, with his sister often appearing as soprano soloist.

== Astronomy ==
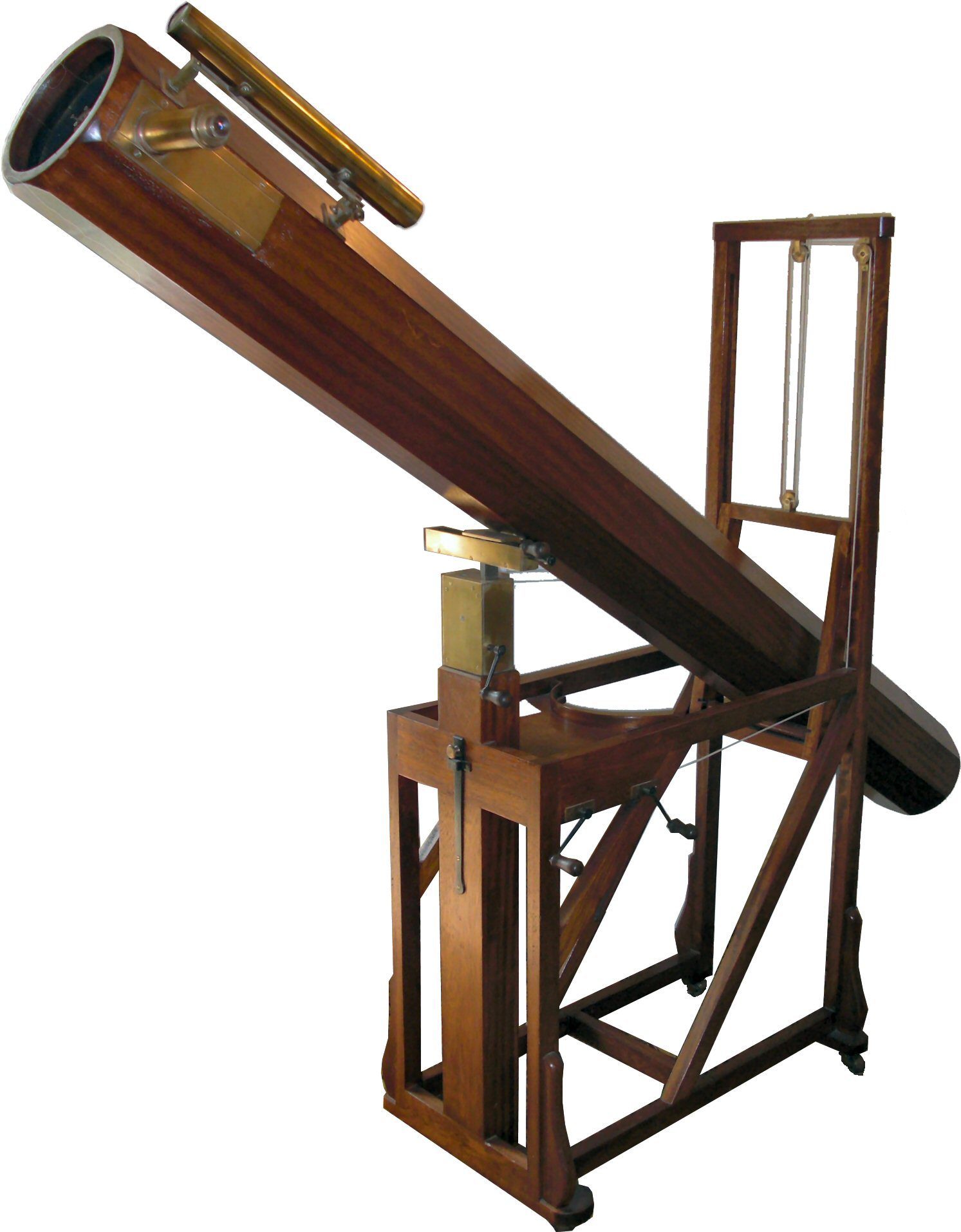
Replica in the William Herschel Museum of a telescope similar to that with which Herschel discovered Uranus

Herschel's reading in natural philosophy during the 1770s not only indicates his personal interests, but also suggests an intention to be upwardly mobile, both socially and professionally. He was well-positioned to engage with eighteenth-century "philosophical gentlemen" or philomaths, of wide-ranging logical and practical tastes.

Herschel's intellectual curiosity and interest in music eventually led him to astronomy, making his first recorded observation in 1766. After reading Robert Smith's Harmonics, or the Philosophy of Musical Sounds (1749), he took up Smith's A Compleat System of Opticks (1738), which described techniques of telescope construction. He also read James Ferguson's Astronomy explained upon Sir Isaac Newton's principles and made easy to those who have not studied mathematics (1756) and William Emerson's The elements of trigonometry (1749), The elements of optics (1768) and The principles of mechanics (1754).

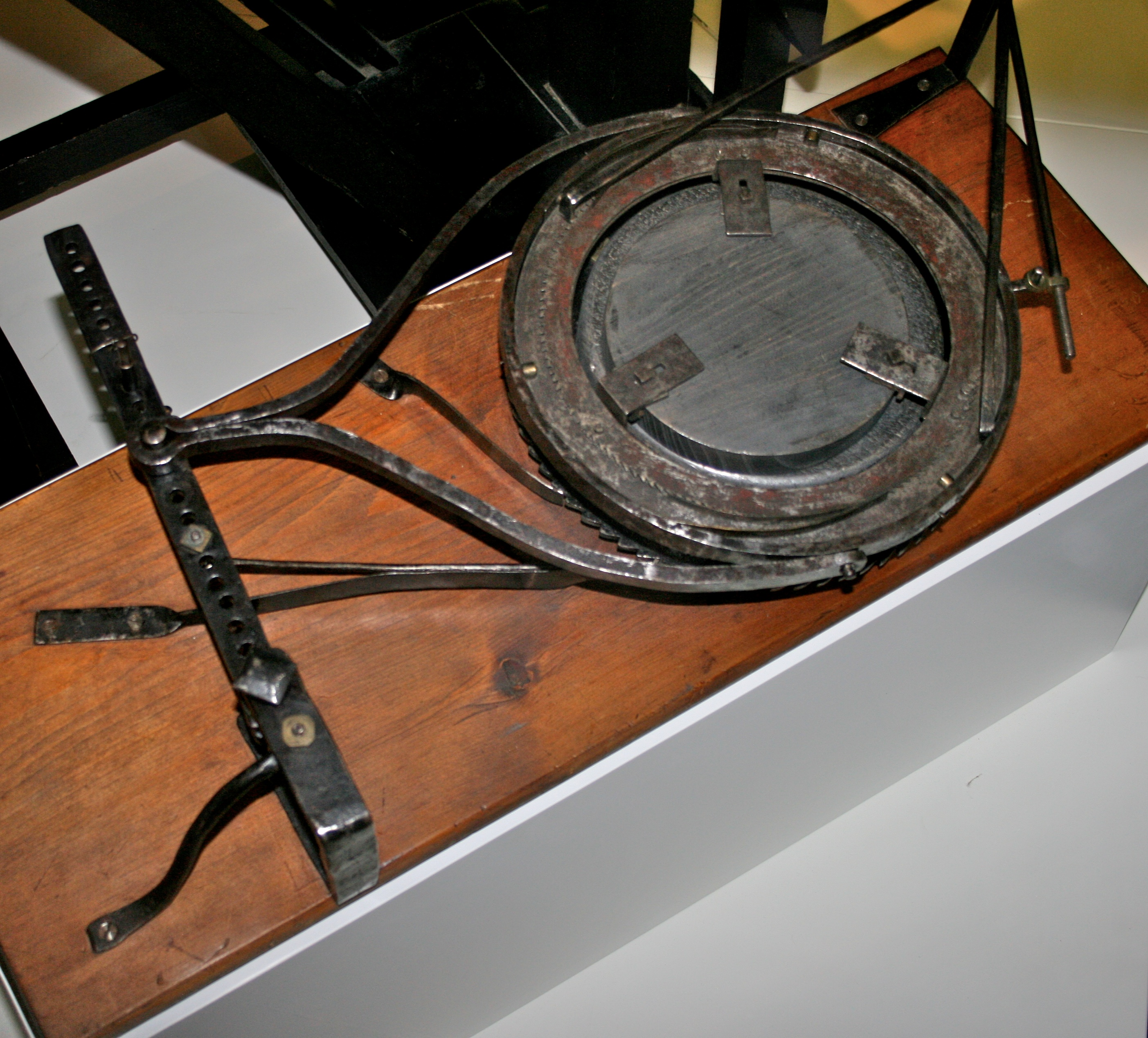
Herschel's mirror polisher, on display in the Science Museum, London

Herschel took lessons from a local mirror-builder and having obtained both tools and a level of expertise, started building his own reflecting telescopes. He would spend up to 16 hours a day grinding and polishing the speculum metal primary mirrors. He relied on the assistance of other family members, particularly his sister Caroline and his brother Alexander, a skilled mechanical craftsperson.

He "began to look at the planets and the stars" in May 1773 and on 1 March 1774 began an astronomical journal by noting his observations of Saturn's rings and the Great Orion Nebula (M42). The English Astronomer Royal, Nevil Maskelyne, visited the Herschels while they were at Walcot (which they left on 29 September 1777). By 1779, Herschel had also made the acquaintance of Sir William Watson, who invited him to join the Bath Philosophical Society. Herschel became an active member, and through Watson would greatly enlarge his circle of contacts. A few years later, in 1785, Herschel was elected an international member of the American Philosophical Society in Philadelphia.

=== Double stars ===
Herschel's early observational work soon focused on the search for pairs of stars that were very close together visually. Astronomers of the era expected that changes over time in the apparent separation and relative location of these stars would provide evidence for both the proper motion of stars and, by means of parallax shifts in their separation, for the distance of stars from the Earth. The latter was a method first suggested by Galileo Galilei. From the back garden of his house in New King Street, Bath, and using a 6.2-inch aperture (160 mm), 7-foot-focal-length (2.1 m) (f/13) Newtonian telescope "with a most capital speculum" of his own manufacture, in October 1779, Herschel began a systematic search for such stars among "every star in the Heavens", with new discoveries listed through 1792. He soon discovered many more binary and multiple stars than expected, and compiled them with careful measurements of their relative positions in two catalogues presented to the Royal Society in London in 1782 (269 double or multiple systems) and 1784 (434 systems). A third catalogue of discoveries made after 1783 was published in 1821 (145 systems).

The Rev. John Michell of Thornhill published work in 1767 on the distribution of double stars, and in 1783 on "dark stars", that may have influenced Herschel. After Michell's death in 1793, Herschel bought a ten-foot-long, 30-inch reflecting telescope from Michell's estate.

In 1797, Herschel measured many of the systems again, and discovered changes in their relative positions that could not be attributed to the parallax caused by the Earth's orbit. He waited until 1802 (in Catalogue of 500 new Nebulae, nebulous Stars, planetary Nebulae, and Clusters of Stars; with Remarks on the Construction of the Heavens) to announce the hypothesis that the two stars were "binary sidereal systems" orbiting under mutual gravitational attraction, a hypothesis he confirmed in 1803 in his Account of the Changes that have happened, during the last Twenty-five Years, in the relative Situation of Double-stars; with an Investigation of the Cause to which they are owing. In all, Herschel discovered over 800 confirmed double or multiple star systems, almost all of them physical rather than optical pairs. His theoretical and observational work provided the foundation for modern binary star astronomy; new catalogues adding to his work were not published until after 1820 by Friedrich Wilhelm Struve, James South and John Herschel.

=== Uranus ===
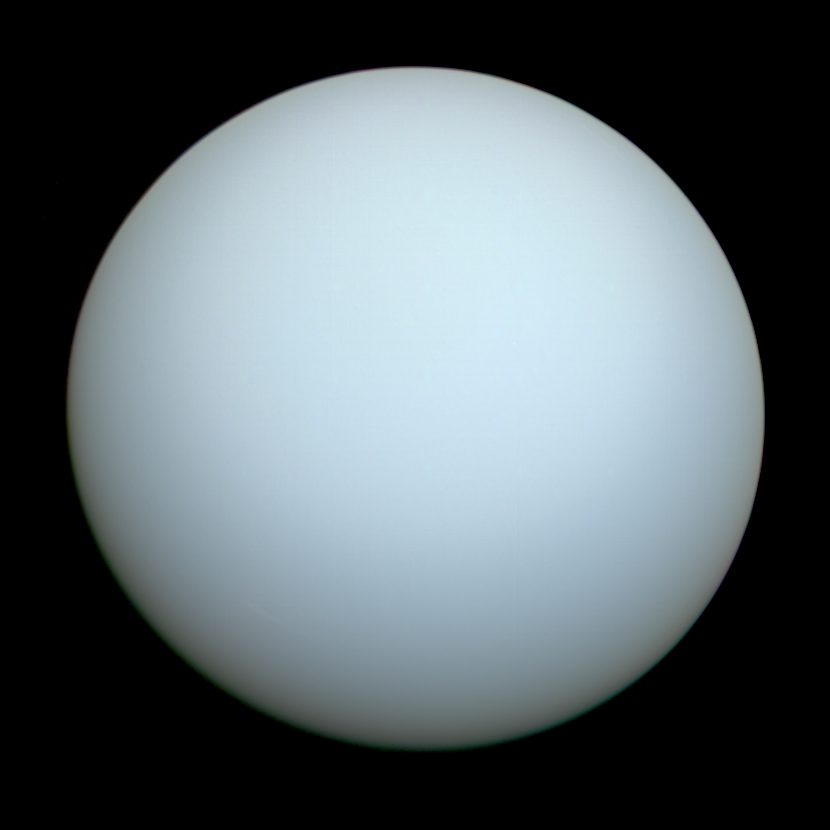
Uranus, discovered by Herschel in 1781

In March 1781, during his search for double stars, Herschel noticed an object appearing as a disk. Herschel originally thought it was a comet or a stellar disc, which he believed he might actually resolve. He reported the sighting to Nevil Maskelyne the Astronomer Royal. He made many more observations of it, and afterwards Finnish-Swedish astronomer Anders Lexell computed the orbit and found it to be probably planetary.

Herschel agreed, determining that it must be a planet beyond the orbit of Saturn. He called the new planet the "Georgian star" (Georgium sidus) after King George III, which also brought him favour; the name did not stick. In France, where reference to the British king was to be avoided if possible, the planet was known as "Herschel" until the name "Uranus" was universally adopted. The same year, Herschel was awarded the Copley Medal and elected a Fellow of the Royal Society. In 1782, he was appointed "The King's Astronomer" (not to be confused with the Astronomer Royal).

On 1 August 1782 Herschel and his sister Caroline moved to Datchet (then in Buckinghamshire but now in Berkshire). There, he continued his work as an astronomer and telescope maker. He achieved an international reputation for their manufacture, profitably selling over 60 completed reflectors to British and Continental astronomers.

=== Deep sky surveys ===
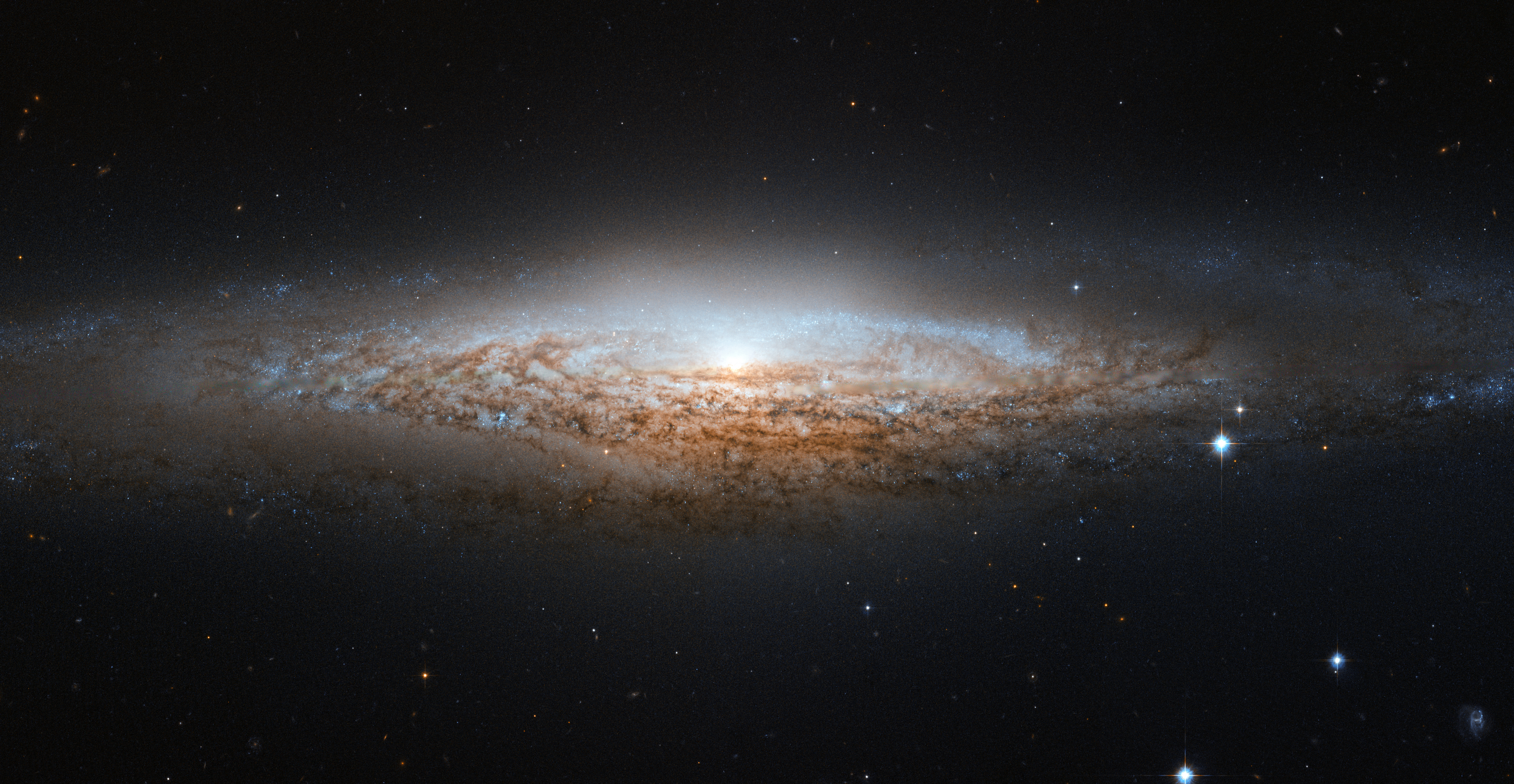
NGC 2683 is an unbarred spiral galaxy discovered by William Herschel on 5 February 1788.

From 1782 to 1802, and most intensively from 1783 to 1790, Herschel conducted systematic surveys in search of "deep-sky" or non-stellar objects with two 20-foot-focal-length (610 cm), 12-and-18.7-inch-aperture (30 and 47 cm) telescopes (in combination with his favoured 6-inch-aperture instrument). Excluding duplicated and "lost" entries, Herschel ultimately discovered over 2,400 objects defined by him as nebulae. (At that time, nebula was the generic term for any visually diffuse astronomical object, including galaxies beyond the Milky Way, until galaxies were confirmed as extragalactic systems by Edwin Hubble in 1924.)

Herschel published his discoveries as three catalogues: Catalogue of One Thousand New Nebulae and Clusters of Stars (1786), Catalogue of a Second Thousand New Nebulae and Clusters of Stars (1789) and the previously cited Catalogue of 500 New Nebulae ... (1802). He arranged his discoveries under eight "classes": (I) bright nebulae, (II) faint nebulae, (III) very faint nebulae, (IV) planetary nebulae, (V) very large nebulae, (VI) very compressed and rich clusters of stars, (VII) compressed clusters of small and large [faint and bright] stars, and (VIII) coarsely scattered clusters of stars. Herschel's discoveries were supplemented by those of Caroline Herschel (11 objects) and his son John Herschel (1754 objects) and published by him as General Catalogue of Nebulae and Clusters in 1864. This catalogue was later edited by John Dreyer, supplemented with discoveries by many other 19th-century astronomers, and published in 1888 as the New General Catalogue (abbreviated NGC) of 7,840 deep-sky objects. The NGC numbering is still the most commonly used identifying label for these celestial landmarks.

Herschel's discoveries later compiled in the New General Catalogue include NGC 12, NGC 13, NGC 14, NGC 16, NGC 23, NGC 24, NGC 1357, and NGC 7457.

=== Works with his sister Caroline Herschel ===
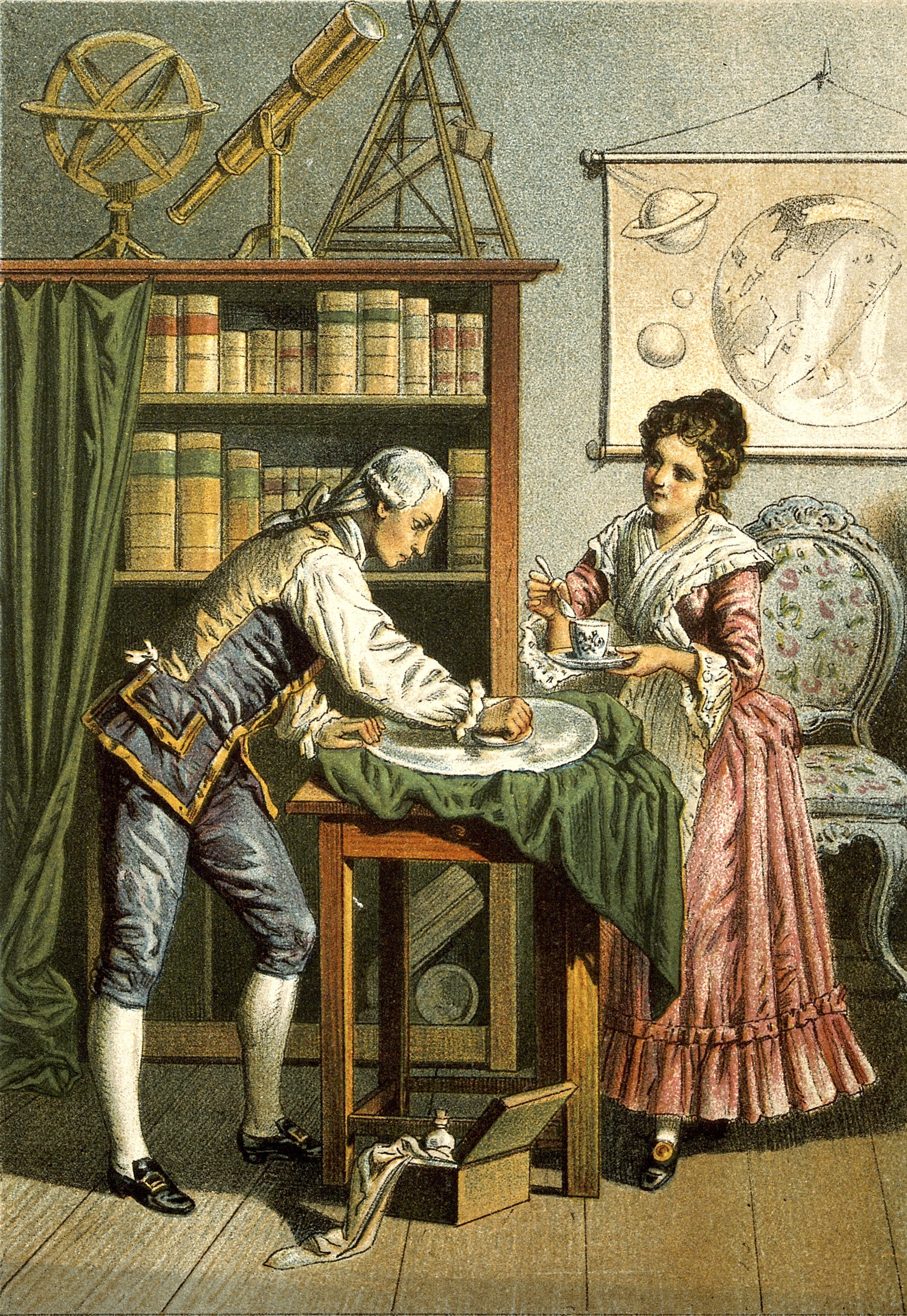
William and Caroline Herschel polishing a telescope lens (probably a mirror); 1896 lithograph

Following the death of their father, William suggested that Caroline join him in Bath, England. In 1772, Caroline was first introduced to astronomy by her brother.

Caroline spent many hours polishing the mirrors of high performance telescopes so that the amount of light captured was maximized. She also copied astronomical catalogues and other publications for William. After William accepted the office of King's Astronomer to George III, Caroline became his constant assistant.

In October 1783, a new 20-foot telescope came into service for William. During this time, William was attempting to observe and then record all of the observations. He had to run inside and let his eyes readjust to the artificial light before he could record anything, and then he would have to wait until his eyes were adjusted to the dark before he could observe again. Caroline became his recorder by sitting at a desk near an open window. William would shout out his observations and she would write them down along with any information he needed from a reference book.

Caroline began to make astronomical discoveries in her own right, particularly comets. In 1783, William built her a small Newtonian reflector telescope, with a handle to make a vertical sweep of the sky. Between 1783 and 1787, she made an independent discovery of M110 (NGC 205), which is the second companion of the Andromeda Galaxy. Between 1786 and 1797, she discovered or observed eight comets. She found fourteen new nebulae and, at her brother's suggestion, updated and corrected Flamsteed's work detailing the position of stars. She also rediscovered Comet Encke in 1795.

Caroline Herschel's eight comets were published between 28 August 1782 to 5 February 1787. Five of her comets were published in Philosophical Transactions of the Royal Society. William was even summoned to Windsor Castle to demonstrate Caroline's comet to the royal family. William recorded this phenomenon himself, terming it "My Sister's Comet". She wrote letters to the Astronomer Royal to announce the discovery of her second comet, and wrote to Joseph Banks upon the discovery of her third and fourth comets.

The Catalogue of stars taken from Mr Flamsteed's observations contained an index of more than 560 stars that had not been previously included. Caroline Herschel was honoured by the Royal Astronomical Society for this work in 1828.

Caroline also continued to serve as William Herschel's assistant, often taking notes while he observed at the telescope. For her work as William's assistant, she was granted an annual salary of £50 by George III. Her appointment made her the first female in England to be honoured with a government position. It also made her the first woman to be given a salary as an astronomer.

In June 1785, owing to damp conditions, William and Caroline moved to Clay Hall in Old Windsor. On 3 April 1786, the Herschels moved to a new residence on Windsor Road in Slough. Herschel lived the rest of his life in this residence, which came to be known as Observatory House. It was demolished in 1963.

William Herschel's marriage in 1788 caused considerable tension in the brother–sister relationship. Caroline has been referred to as a bitter, jealous woman who worshipped her brother and resented her sister-in-law for invading her domestic life. With the arrival of Mary, Caroline lost her managerial and social responsibilities in the household, and with them much of her status. Caroline destroyed her journals between the years 1788 to 1798, so her feelings during this period are not entirely known. According to her memoir, Caroline then moved to separate lodgings, but continued to work as her brother's assistant. When her brother and his family were away from their home, she would often return to take care of it for them. In later life, Caroline and Lady Herschel exchanged affectionate letters.

Caroline continued her astronomical work after William's death in 1822. She worked to verify and confirm his findings as well as putting together catalogues of nebulae. Towards the end of her life, she arranged two-and-a-half thousand nebulae and star clusters into zones of similar polar distances. She did this so that her nephew, John, could re-examine them systematically. Eventually, this list was enlarged and renamed the New General Catalogue. In 1828, she was awarded the Gold Medal of the Royal Astronomical Society for her work.

=== Herschel's telescopes ===
The most common type of telescope at that time was the refracting telescope, which involved the refraction of light through a tube using a convex glass lens. This design was subject to chromatic aberration, a distortion of an image due to the failure of light of different component wavelengths to converge. Optician John Dollond tried to correct for this distortion by combining two separate lenses, but it was still difficult to achieve good resolution for far distant light sources.

Reflector telescopes, invented by Isaac Newton in 1668, used a single concave mirror rather than a convex lens. This avoids chromatic aberration. The concave mirror gathered more light than a lens, reflecting it onto a flat mirror at the end of the telescope for viewing. A smaller mirror could provide greater magnification and a larger field of view than a convex lens. Newton's first mirror was 1.3 inches in diameter; such mirrors were rarely more than 3 inches in diameter.

Because of the poor reflectivity of mirrors made of speculum metal, Herschel eliminated the small diagonal mirror of a standard newtonian reflector from his design and tilted his primary mirror so he could view the formed image directly. This "front view" design has come to be called the Herschelian telescope.

The creation of larger, symmetrical mirrors was extremely difficult. Any flaw would result in a blurred image. Because no one else was making mirrors of the size and magnification desired by Herschel, he determined to make his own. This was no small undertaking. He was assisted by his sister Caroline and other family members. Caroline Herschel described the pouring of a 30-foot-focal-length mirror:

A day was set apart for casting, and the metal was in the furnace, but unfortunately it began to leak at the moment when ready for pouring, and both my brothers and the caster with his men were obliged to run out at opposite doors, for the stone flooring (which ought to have been taken up) flew about in all directions, as high as the ceiling. My poor brother fell, exhausted with heat and exertion, on a heap of brickbats. Before the second casting was attempted, everything which could ensure success had been attended to, and a very perfect metal was found in the mould, which had cracked in the cooling.

— Caroline Herschel

Herschel is reported to have cast, ground, and polished more than four hundred mirrors for telescopes, varying in size from 6 to 48 inches in diameter. Herschel and his assistants built and sold at least sixty complete telescopes of various sizes. Commissions for the making and selling of mirrors and telescopes provided Herschel with an additional source of income. The King of Spain reportedly paid £3,150 for a telescope.

An essential part of constructing and maintaining telescopes was the grinding and polishing of their mirrors. This had to be done repeatedly, whenever the mirrors deformed or tarnished during use. The only way to test the accuracy of a mirror was to use it.

==== 40-foot telescope ====
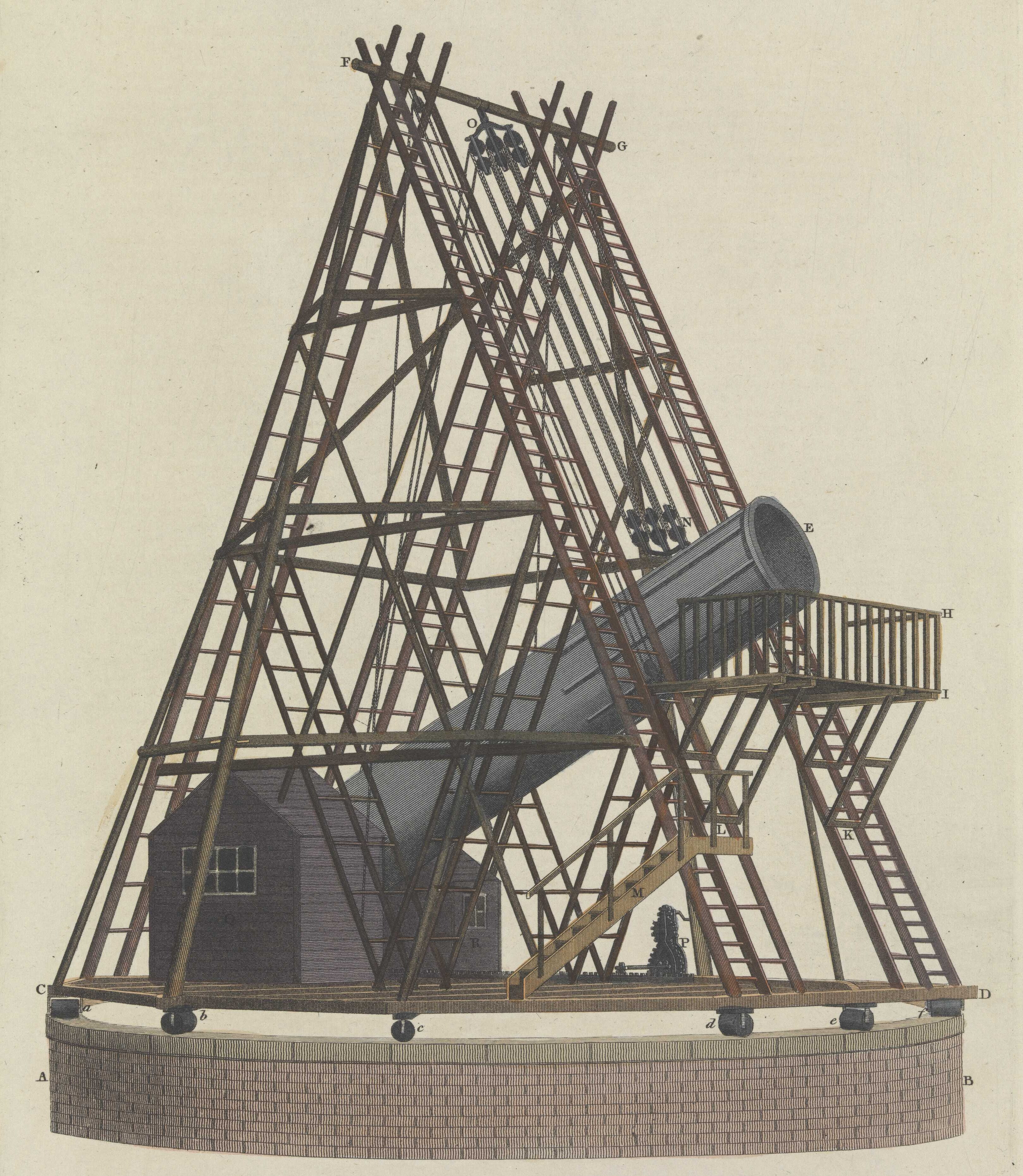
The 40-foot (12 m) telescope

The largest and most famous of Herschel's telescopes was a reflecting telescope with a 49 1/2-inch-diameter (1.26 m) primary mirror and a 40-foot (12 m) focal length. The 40-foot telescope was, at that time, the largest scientific instrument that had been built. It was hailed as a triumph of "human perseverance and zeal for the sublimest science".

In 1785 Herschel approached King George for money to cover the cost of building the 40-foot telescope. He received £4,000. Without royal patronage, the telescope could not have been created. As it was, it took five years, and went over budget.

The Herschel home in Slough became a scramble of "labourers and workmen, smiths and carpenters". A 40-foot telescope tube had to be cast of iron. The tube was large enough to walk through. Mirror blanks were poured from Speculum metal, a mix of copper and tin. They were almost four feet (1.2 m) in diameter and weighed 1,000 pounds (450 kg). When the first disk deformed due to its weight, a second thicker one was made with a higher content of copper. The mirrors had to be hand-polished, a painstaking process. A mirror was repeatedly put into the telescope and removed again to ensure that it was properly formed. When a mirror deformed or tarnished, it had to be removed, repolished and replaced in the apparatus. A huge rotating platform was built to support the telescope, enabling it to be repositioned by assistants as a sweep progressed. A platform near the top of the tube enabled the viewer to look down into the tube and view the resulting image.

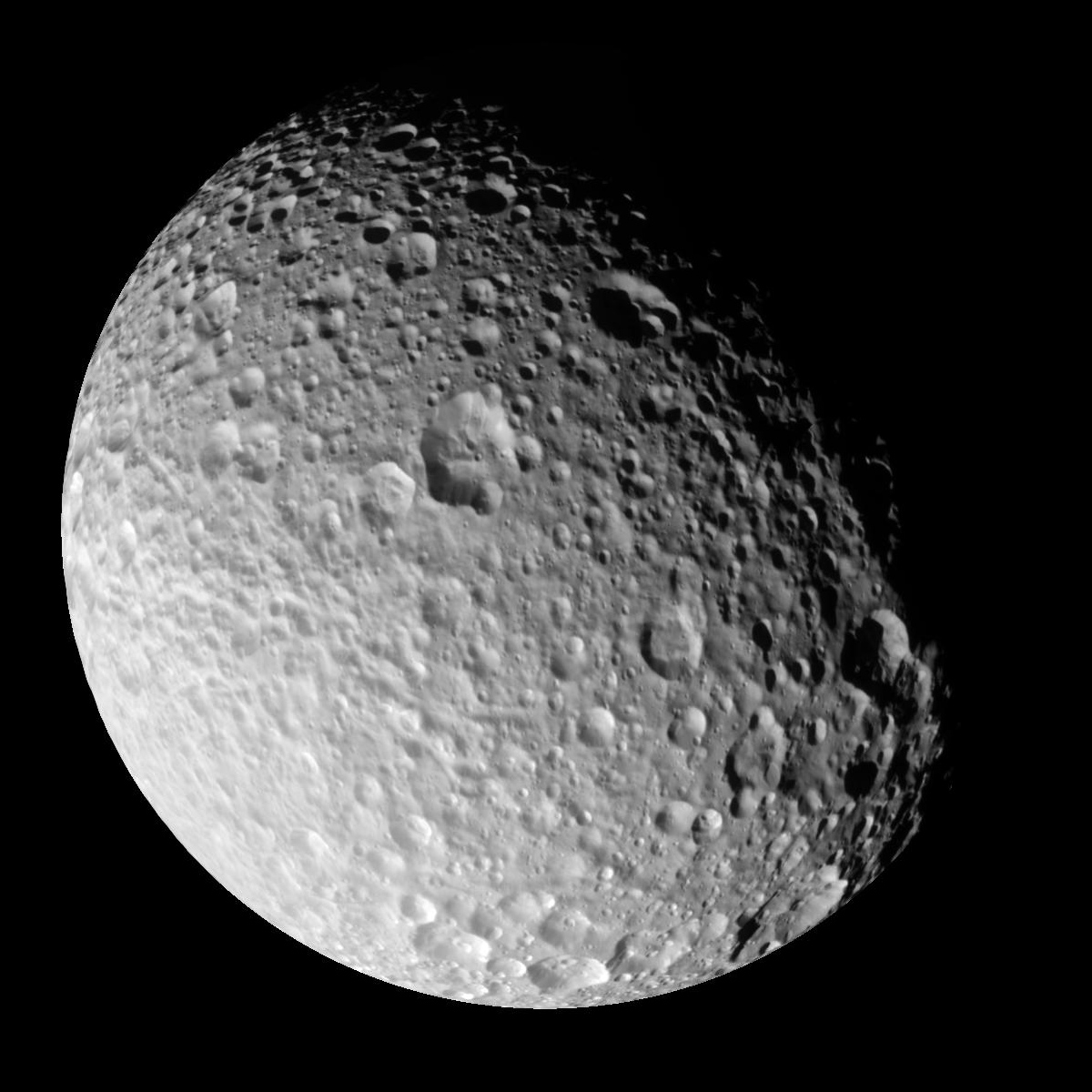
A Cassini orbiter's view of Mimas, a moon of Saturn discovered by Herschel in 1789

In 1789, shortly after this instrument was operational, Herschel discovered a new moon of Saturn: Mimas, only 250 miles (400 km) in diameter. Discovery of a second moon (Enceladus) followed, within the first month of observation.

The 40-foot (12-metre) telescope proved very cumbersome, and in spite of its size, not very effective at showing clearer images. Herschel's technological innovations had taken him to the limits of what was possible with the technology of his day. The 40-foot would not be improved upon until the Victorians developed techniques for the precision engineering of large, high-quality mirrors. William Herschel was disappointed with it. Most of Herschel's observations were done with a smaller 18.5-inch (47 cm), 20-foot-focal-length (6.1 m) reflector. Nonetheless, the 40-foot caught the public imagination. It inspired scientists and writers including Erasmus Darwin and William Blake, and impressed foreign tourists and French dignitaries. King George was pleased.

Herschel discovered that unfilled telescope apertures can be used to obtain high angular resolution, something which became the essential basis for interferometric imaging in astronomy (in particular aperture masking interferometry and hypertelescopes).

==== Reconstruction of the 20-foot telescope ====
In 2012, the BBC television programme Stargazing Live built a replica of the 20-foot telescope using Herschel's original plans but modern materials. It is to be considered a close modern approximation rather than an exact replica. A modern glass mirror was used, the frame uses metal scaffolding and the tube is a sewer pipe. The telescope was shown on the programme in January 2013 and stands on the Art, Design, and Technology campus of the University of Derby where it will be used for educational purposes.

=== Life on other celestial bodies ===
Herschel was sure that he had found ample evidence of life on the Moon and compared it to the English countryside. He did not refrain himself from theorising that the other planets were populated, with a special interest in Mars, which was in line with most of his contemporary scientists. During Herschel's time, scientists tended to believe in a plurality of civilised worlds; in contrast, most religious thinkers referred to unique properties of the Earth. Herschel went so far as to speculate that the interior of the Sun was populated.

=== Sunspots, climate and wheat yields ===
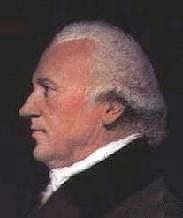
William Herschel, portrait by James Sharples, c. 1805

Herschel examined the correlation of solar variation and solar cycle and climate. Over a period of 40 years (1779–1818), Herschel regularly observed sunspots and their variations in number, form and size. Most of his observations took place in a period of low solar activity, the Dalton Minimum, when sunspots were relatively few in number. This was one of the reasons why Herschel was not able to identify the standard 11-year period in solar activity. Herschel compared his observations with the series of wheat prices published by Adam Smith in The Wealth of Nations.

In 1801, Herschel reported his findings to the Royal Society and indicated five prolonged periods of few sunspots correlated with the price of wheat. Herschel's study was ridiculed by some of his contemporaries but did initiate further attempts to find a correlation. Later in the 19th century, William Stanley Jevons proposed the 11-year cycle with Herschel's basic idea of a correlation between the low number of sunspots and lower yields explaining recurring booms and slumps in the economy.

Herschel's speculation on a connection between sunspots and regional climate, using the market price of wheat as a proxy, continues to be cited. According to one study, the influence of solar activity can actually be seen on the historical wheat market in England over ten solar cycles between 1600 and 1700. The evaluation is controversial and the significance of the correlation is doubted by some scientists.

=== Further discoveries ===
Planets discovered: 1
Uranus	13 March 1781

Moons discovered: 4
Oberon	11 January 1787
Titania	11 January 1787
Enceladus	28 August 1789
Mimas	17 September 1789

In his later career, Herschel discovered two moons of Saturn, Mimas and Enceladus; as well as two moons of Uranus, Titania and Oberon. He did not give these moons their names; they were named by his son John in 1847 and 1852, respectively, after his death. Herschel measured the axial tilt of Mars and discovered that the Martian ice caps, first observed by Giovanni Domenico Cassini (1666) and Christiaan Huygens (1672), changed size with that planet's seasons. It has been suggested that Herschel discovered rings around Uranus.

Herschel introduced but did not create the word "asteroid", meaning star-like (from the Greek asteroeides, aster "star" + -eidos "form, shape"), in 1802 (shortly after Olbers discovered the second minor planet, 2 Pallas, in late March), to describe the star-like appearance of the small moons of the giant planets and of the minor planets; the planets all show discs, by comparison. By the 1850s 'asteroid' became a standard term for describing certain minor planets.

From studying the proper motion of stars, the nature and extent of the solar motion was first demonstrated by Herschel in 1783, along with first determining the direction for the solar apex to Lambda Herculis, only 10° away from today's accepted position.

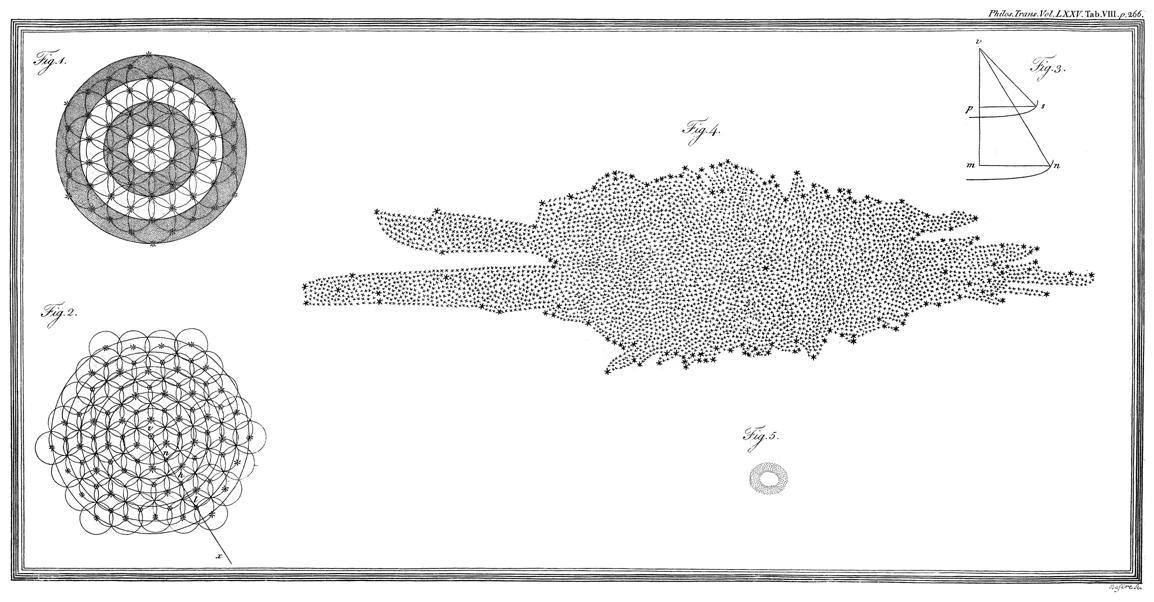
William Herschel's model of the Milky Way, 1785

Herschel also studied the structure of the Milky Way and was the first to propose a model of the galaxy based on observation and measurement. He concluded that it was in the shape of a disk, but incorrectly assumed that the Sun was in the centre of the disk. This heliocentric view was eventually replaced by galactocentrism due to the work of Harlow Shapley, Heber Doust Curtis and Edwin Hubble in the 20th century. All three men used significantly more far-reaching and accurate telescopes than Herschel's.

== Discovery of infrared radiation in sunlight ==
In early 1800, Herschel was testing different filters to pass sunlight through, and noticed that filters of different colours seemed to generate varying amounts of heat. He decided to pass the light through a prism to measure the different colours of light using a thermometer, and in the process, took a measurement just beyond the red end of the visible spectrum. He detected a temperature one degree higher than that of red light. Further experimentation led to Herschel's conclusion that there must be an invisible form of light beyond the visible spectrum, infrared. He published these results in April 1800.

== Biology ==
Herschel used a microscope to establish that coral was not a plant – as many at the time believed – because it lacked the cell walls characteristic of plants. It is in fact an animal, a marine invertebrate.

== Family and death ==
William Herschel's coat of arms deemed a notorious example of debased heraldry: Argent, on a mount vert a representation of the 40 ft. reflecting telescope with its apparatus proper on a chief azure the astronomical symbol of Uranus irradiated or. Crest: A demi terrestrial sphere proper thereon an eagle, wings elevated or

On 8 May 1788, Herschel married the widow Mary Pitt (née Baldwin) at St Laurence's Church, Upton in Slough. They had one child, John, born at Observatory House on 7 March 1792. Herschel's personal background and rise as man of science had a profound impact on the upbringing of his son and grandchildren. He was elected a Foreign Honorary Member of the American Academy of Arts and Sciences in 1788. In 1816, William was made a Knight of the Royal Guelphic Order by the Prince Regent and was accorded the honorary title 'Sir' although this was not the equivalent of an official British knighthood.

Herschel received British citizenship in 1793.

He helped to found the Astronomical Society of London in 1820, which in 1831 received a royal charter and became the Royal Astronomical Society. In 1813, he was elected a foreign member of the Royal Swedish Academy of Sciences.

On 25 August 1822, Herschel died at Observatory House, Windsor Road, Slough, Buckinghamshire, after a long illness. Caroline was deeply distressed by his death, and soon after his burial she returned to Hanover, a decision she later regretted. She had lived in England for fifty years. Her interests were much more in line with her nephew John Herschel, also an astronomer, than with her surviving family in Hanover. She continued to work on the organization and cataloguing of nebulae, creating what would later become the basis of the New General Catalogue. She died on 9 January 1848.

== Memorial ==
William Herschel lived most of his life in the town of Slough, then in Buckinghamshire (now in Berkshire). He died in the town and was buried under the tower of the nearby St Laurence's Church, Upton-cum-Chalvey. Herschel's epitaph is:

Coelorum perrupit claustra
(He broke through the barriers of the heavens)

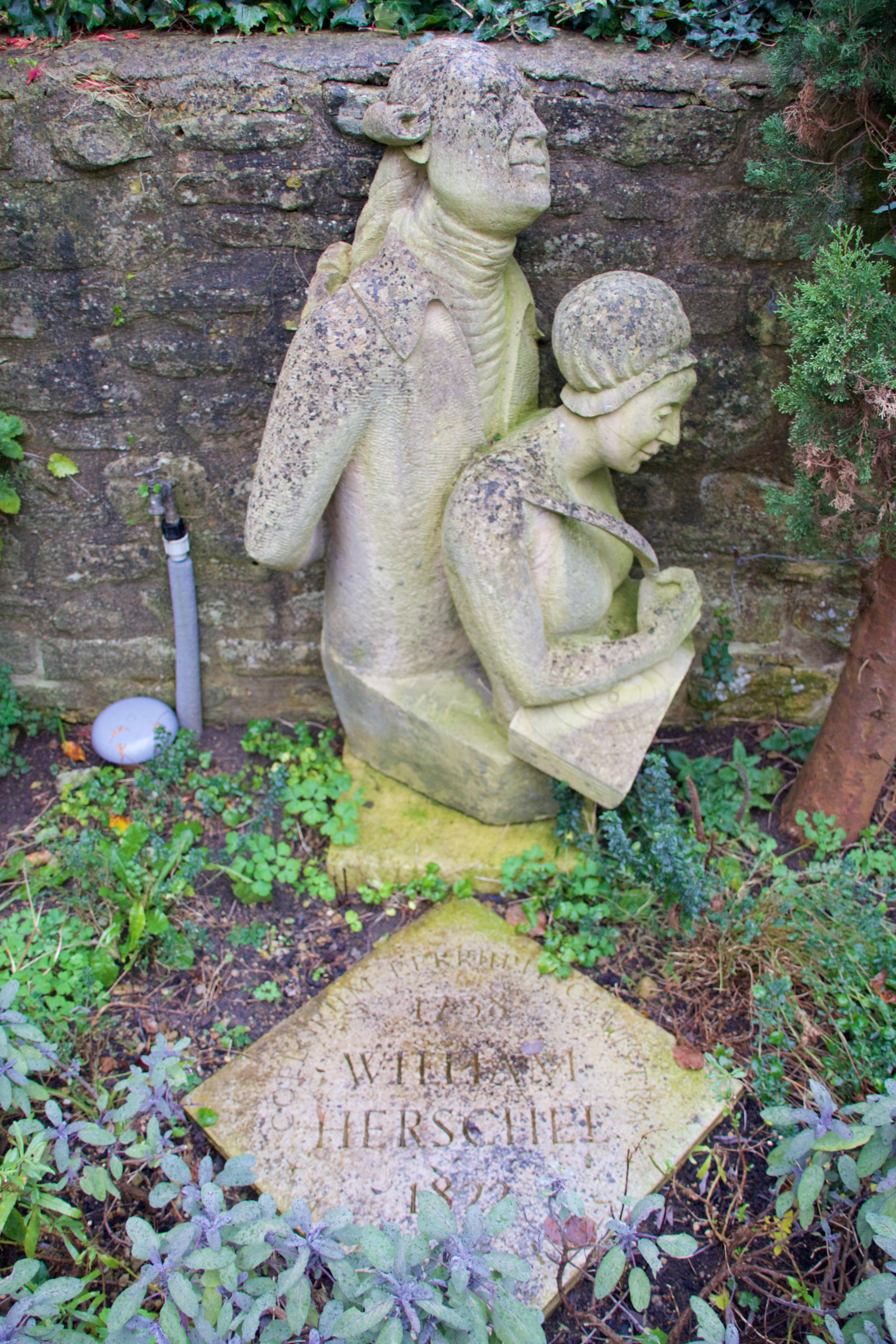
Statue of William and Caroline in the garden of the Herschel Museum of Astronomy in Bath where William discovered Uranus

Herschel is especially honoured in Slough and there are several memorials to him and his discoveries. In 2011 a new bus station, the design of which was inspired by the infrared experiment of William Herschel, was built in the centre of Slough.

John Keats alludes to Herschel's discovery of Uranus in his 1816 sonnet "On First Looking into Chapman's Homer": "Then felt I like some watcher of the skies/ When a new planet swims into his ken." Richard Holmes says that Keats "picks out the finding of Uranus, thirty-five years before, as one of the defining moments of the age."

His house at 19 New King Street in Bath, Somerset, where he made many telescopes and first observed Uranus, is now home to the Herschel Museum of Astronomy. There is a commemorative plaque of Herschel installed by the Institute of Physics in London. There is a memorial plaque of William near the choir screen in Westminster Abbey.

== Musical works ==
Herschel's complete musical works are as follows:

- 18 symphonies for small orchestra (1760–1762)
- 6 symphonies for large orchestra (1762–1764)
- 12 concertos for oboe, violin and viola (1759–1764)
- 2 concertos for organ
- 6 sonatas for violin, cello and harpsichord (published 1769)
- 12 solos for violin and basso continuo (1763)
- 24 capriccios and 1 sonata for solo violin
- 1 andante for two basset horns, two oboes, two horns and two bassoons.

Various vocal works including a "Te Deum", psalms, motets and sacred chants along with some catches.

Keyboard works for organ and harpsichord:

- 6 fugues for organ
- 24 sonatas for organ (10 now lost)
- 33 voluntaries and pieces for organ (incomplete)
- 24 pieces for organ (incomplete)
- 12 voluntaries (11 now lost)
- 12 sonatas for harpsichord (9 extant)
- 25 variations on an ascending scale
- 2 minuets for harpsichord

== Named after Herschel ==
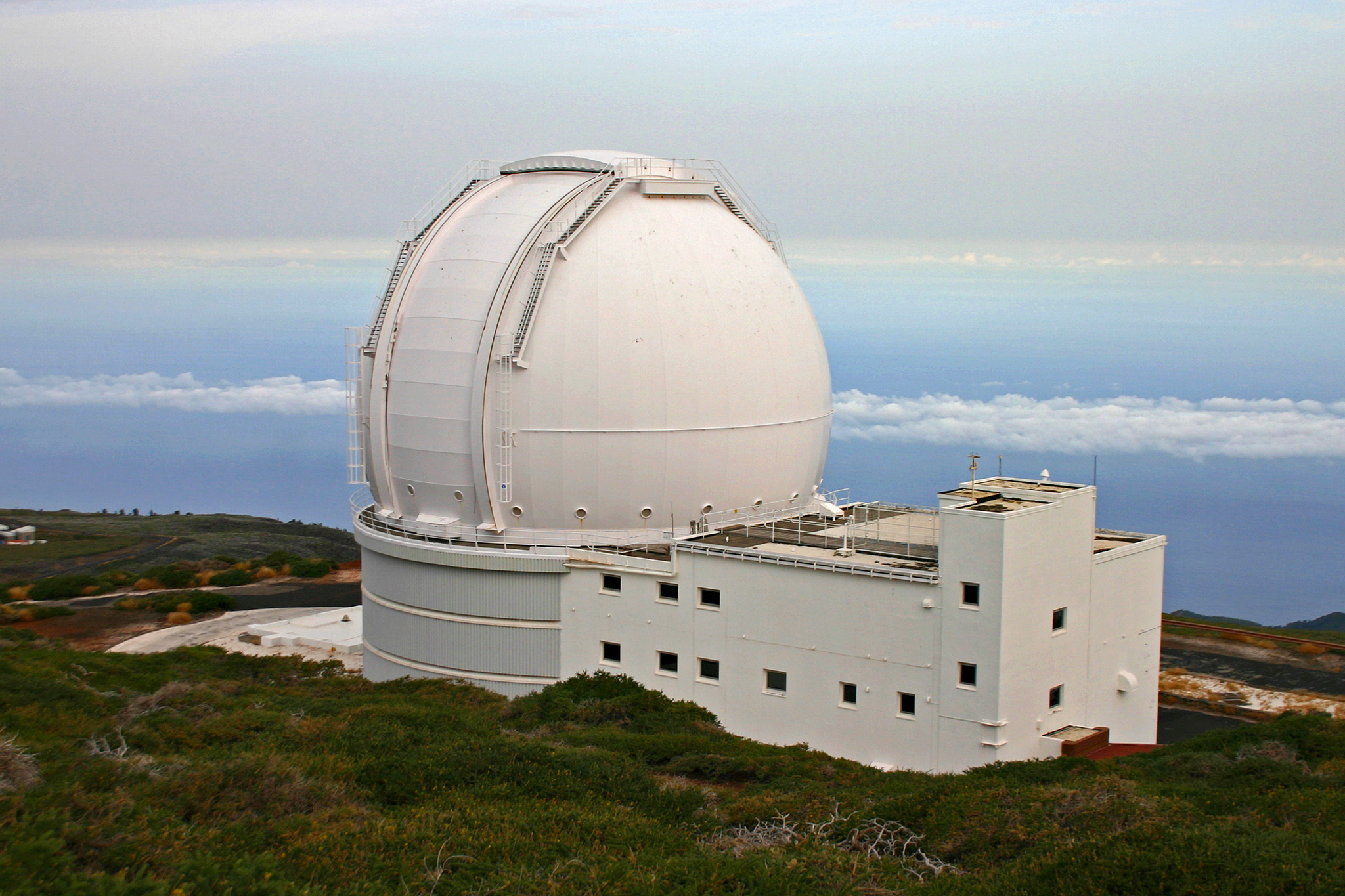
The William Herschel Telescope in La Palma. Funded by research councils from the UK, the Netherlands and Spain, it was built in 1987.

- The astrological symbol for planet Uranus features the capital initial letter of Herschel's surname.
- Mu Cephei is also known as Herschel's Garnet Star
- Herschel, a crater on the Moon
- Herschel, a large impact basin on Mars
- The enormous crater Herschel on Saturn's moon Mimas
- The Herschel gap in Saturn's rings.
- 2000 Herschel, an asteroid
- The William Herschel Telescope on La Palma
- The Herschel Space Observatory, successfully launched by the European Space Agency on 14 May 2009. It was the largest space telescope of its kind, until the launch of the James Webb Space Telescope.
- Herschel Grammar School, Slough
- Rue Herschel, a street in the 6th arrondissement of Paris.
- The Herschel Building at Bath College, Bath
- The Herschel building at Newcastle University, Newcastle, United Kingdom
- Herschel Museum of Astronomy, at 19 New King Street in Bath.
- Herschelschule, Hanover, Germany, a grammar school
- The Herschel Observatory, at the Universitas School in Santos, Brazil.
- The lunar crater C. Herschel, the asteroid 281 Lucretia, and the comet 35P/Herschel-Rigollet are named after his sister Caroline Herschel.
- The public house "Herschel Arms" at 22 Park Street, Slough is named after him and is quite close to the site of Observatory House.
- Herschel Astronomical Society, the operator of the Herschel Memorial Observatory based in Eton, Berkshire.
- Herschel Park, Slough.
- The shape of Slough Bus Station, built in 2011, was inspired by Herschel's infrared experiment.
- Herschel Street, a street in Brisbane, Australia.

== See also ==
- Catalogue of Nebulae and Clusters of Stars
- List of astronomical instrument makers
- List of largest optical telescopes historically
- NGC 4800
- NGC 4694

== Brothers and sisters ==
- Sophia Elizabeth Herschel (1733–1803) – in 1755 married violinist Johann Heinrich Griesbach (1730–1773), she lived in Hannover all her life, and had seven children.
- Heinrich Anton Jacob Herschel (1734–1792) – musician, unmarried
- Johann Heinrich Herschel (1736–1743)
- Anna Christina Herschel (1741–1748) – died of whooping cough.
- Johann Alexander Herschel (1745–1821) – he was married to Margarethe Smith, no children.
- Maria Dorothea Herschel (1748–1749)
- Caroline Lucretia Herschel (1750–1848)
- Franz Johann Herschel (1752–1754) – died from smallpox.
- Johann Dietrich Herschel (1755–1827) – musician, he married Catharina Maria Reiff (1760–1846) and had four children.

== Sources ==
- Holden, Edward S. (1881). Sir William Herschel, his life and works . New York: Charles Scribner's Sons – via Wikisource.
- Holmes, Richard (2008). The age of wonder. New York: Vintage Books. ISBN 978-1-4000-3187-0.
- Mullaney, James (2007). The Herschel objects and how to observe them. Springer. ISBN 978-0-387-68124-5.
