= NGC 7457 =

Galaxy in the constellation Pegasus

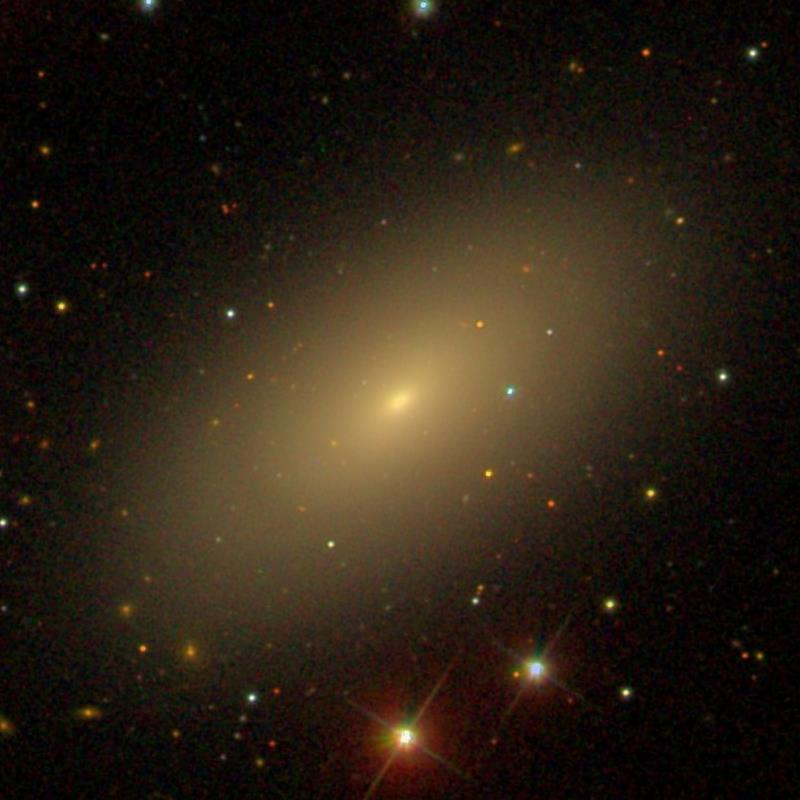
- SDSS image of NGC 7457

Observation data (J2000 epoch)
- Constellation: Pegasus
- Right ascension: 23^{h} 00^{m} 59.934^{s}
- Declination: +30° 08′ 41.79″
- Heliocentric radial velocity: 812 km/s
- Distance: 43 Mly (13.2 Mpc)
- Apparent magnitude (V): 11.87
- Apparent magnitude (B): 11.04

Characteristics
- Type: SA0^{−}(rs)?

Other designations
- UGC 12306, MCG +05-54-026, PGC 70258

NGC 7457 is an unbarred lenticular galaxy in the constellation Pegasus. NGC 7457 is its New General Catalogue designation. It was discovered by the astronomer William Herschel on 12 September 1784.

NGC 7457 is estimated to be about 43 million light-years (13.2 megaparsecs) away from the Sun. There are about 201 globular clusters in the galaxy. The core of NGC 7457 is surprisingly bright and compact, with many stars.

== Gallery ==
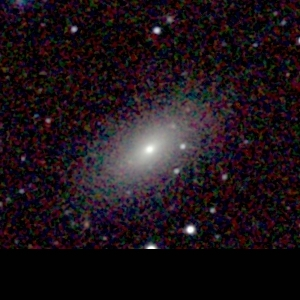
2MASS image of NGC 7457

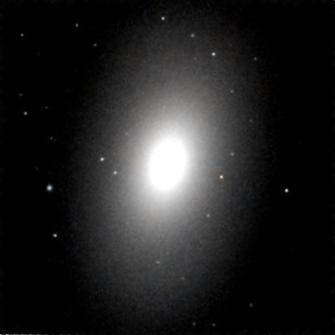
Hubble Space Telescope image of NGC 7457
