= NGC 4694 =

Lenticular galaxy in the constellation Virgo

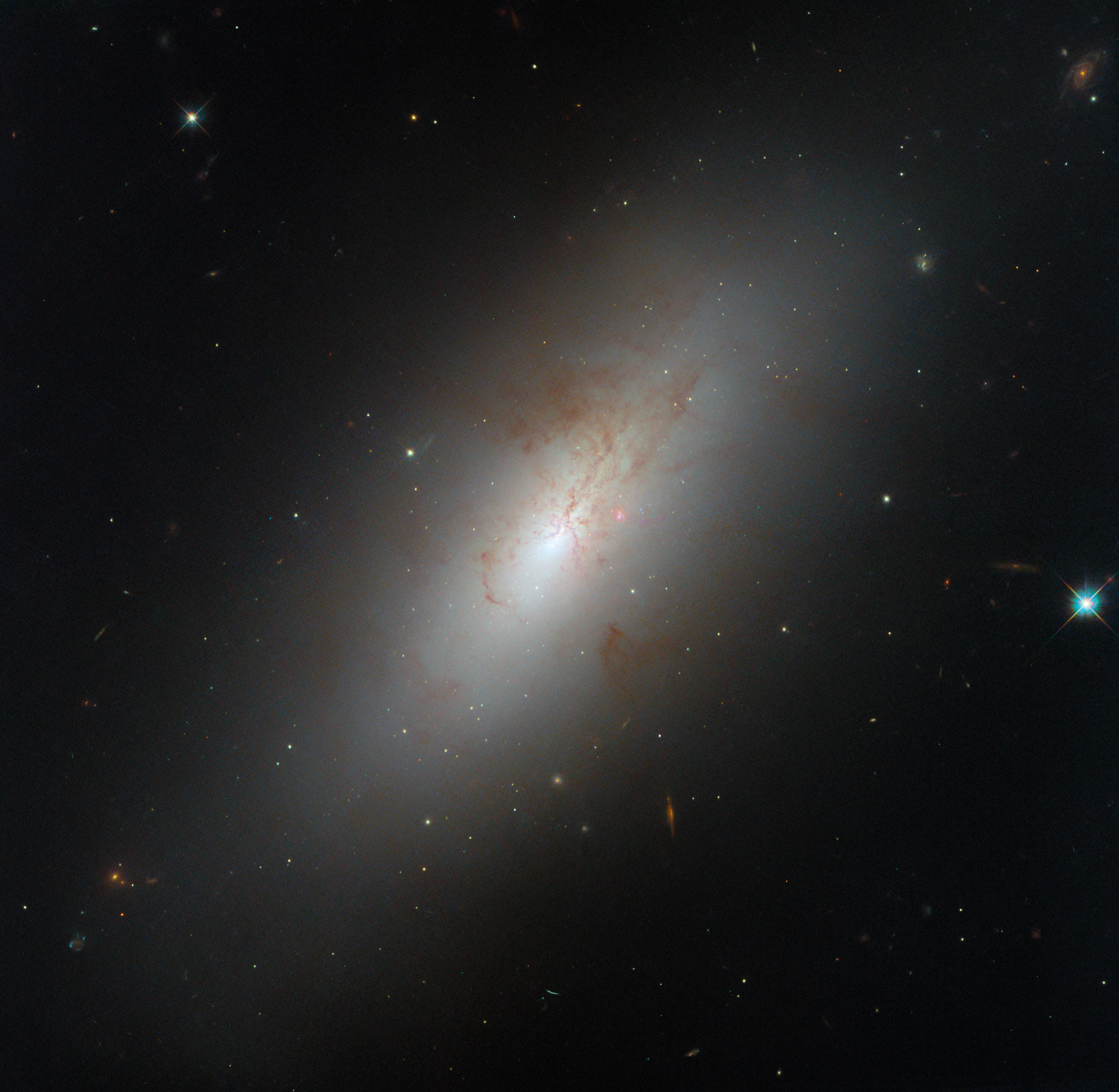
- NGC 4694 imaged by the Hubble Space Telescope

Observation data (J2000 epoch)
- Constellation: Virgo
- Right ascension: 12^{h} 48^{m} 15.0422^{s}
- Declination: +10° 59′ 01.671″
- Redshift: 0.003869
- Heliocentric radial velocity: 1160 ± 2 km/s
- Distance: 71.3 ± 5.1 Mly (21.85 ± 1.57 Mpc)
- Group or cluster: LGG 292
- Apparent magnitude (V): 13.36
- Apparent magnitude (B): 13.93

Characteristics
- Type: SB0 pec (HII)
- Size: ~29,000 ly (8.90 kpc) (estimated)
- Apparent size (V): 3.3′ × 1.6′

Other designations
- IRAS 12457+1115, UGC 7969, MCG +02-33-023, PGC 43241, CGCG 071-044

NGC 4694 is a lenticular galaxy in the constellation Virgo. Its velocity with respect to the cosmic microwave background is 1481 ± 23 km/s, which corresponds to a Hubble distance of 71.3 ± 5.1 Mly (21.85 ± 1.57 Mpc). However, six non redshift measurements give a distance of 28.51 ± 7.23 Mly (8.742 ± 2.218 Mpc). The galaxy was discovered by William Herschel on March 15, 1784.

According to the SIMBAD database, NGC 4694 has an Active Galaxy Nucleus, i.e. it has a compact region at the center of a galaxy that emits a significant amount of energy across the electromagnetic spectrum, with characteristics indicating that this luminosity is not produced by the stars.

== M49 Group ==
According to A.M. Garcia, NGC 4694 is one of 127 galaxies in the M49 group (also known as LGG 292). This group includes 63 galaxies from the New General Catalogue, including NGC 4382 (M85), NGC 4472 (M49), NGC 4516, NGC 4649 (M60) and 20 galaxies from the Index Catalogue.

== See also ==
- List of NGC objects (4001–5000)

== Gallery ==
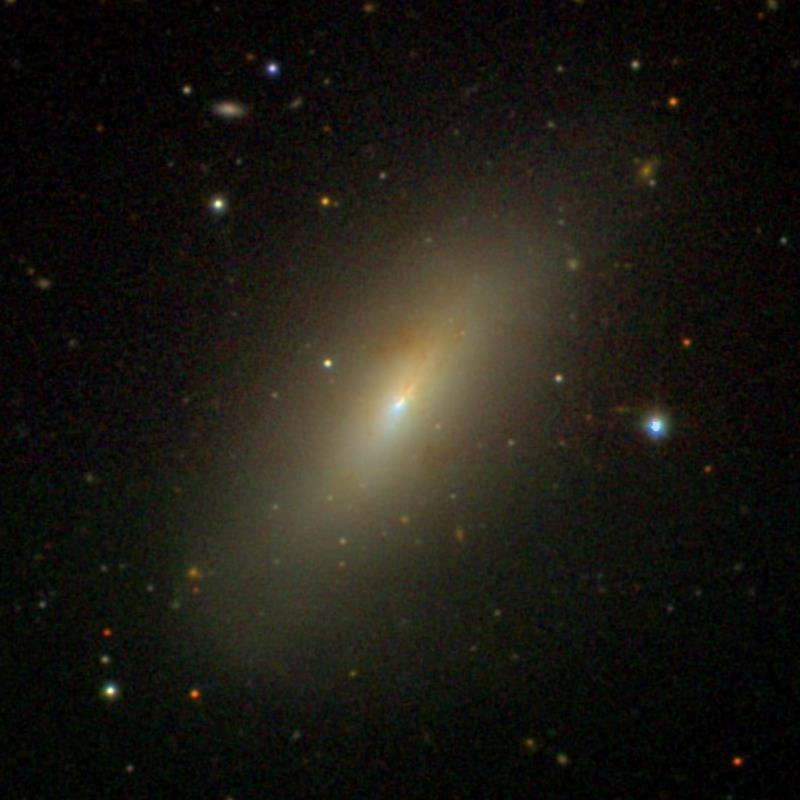
SDSS image of NGC 4694

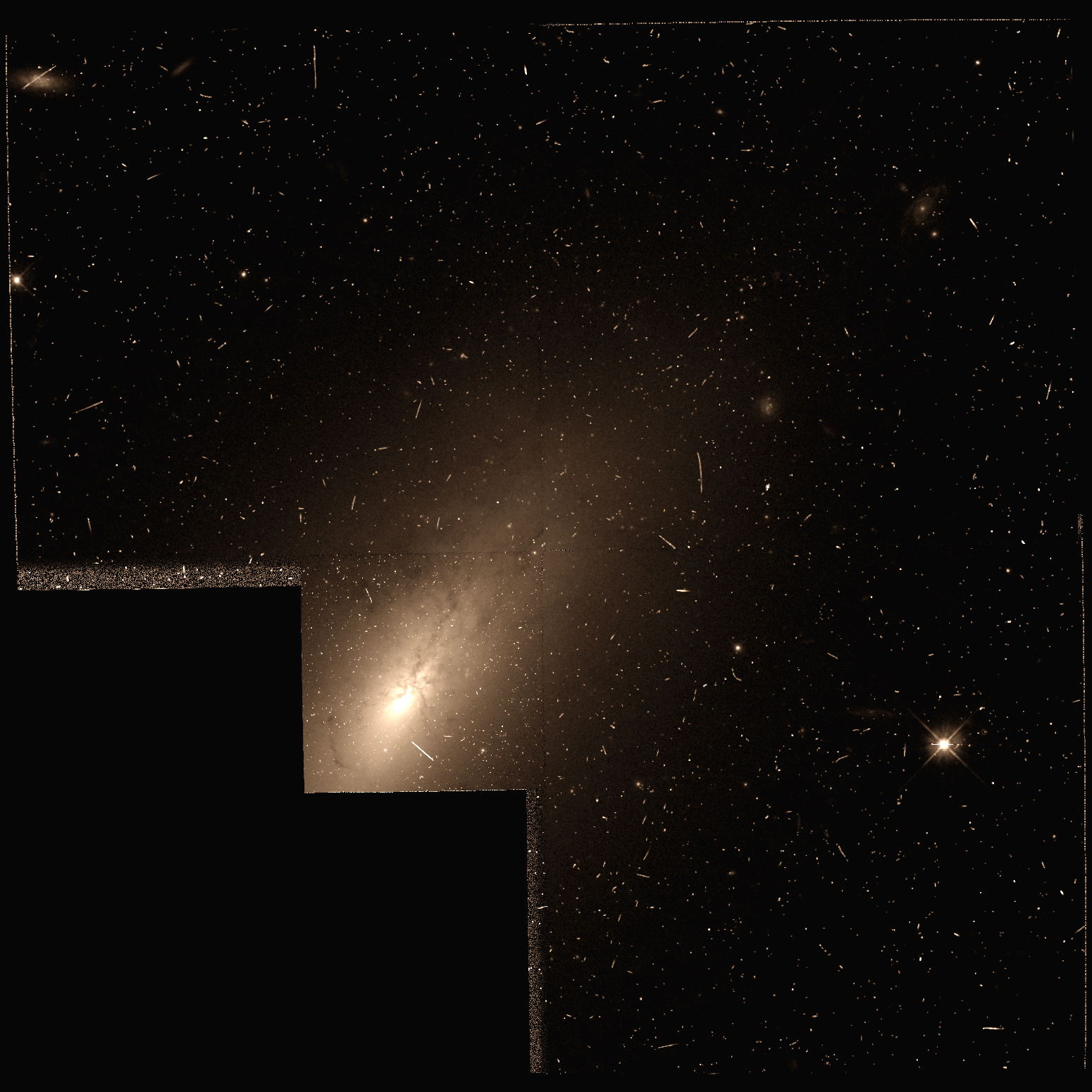
NGC 4694 Imaged by the Hubble Space Telescope
