= NGC 15 =

Spiral galaxy in the constellation Pegasus

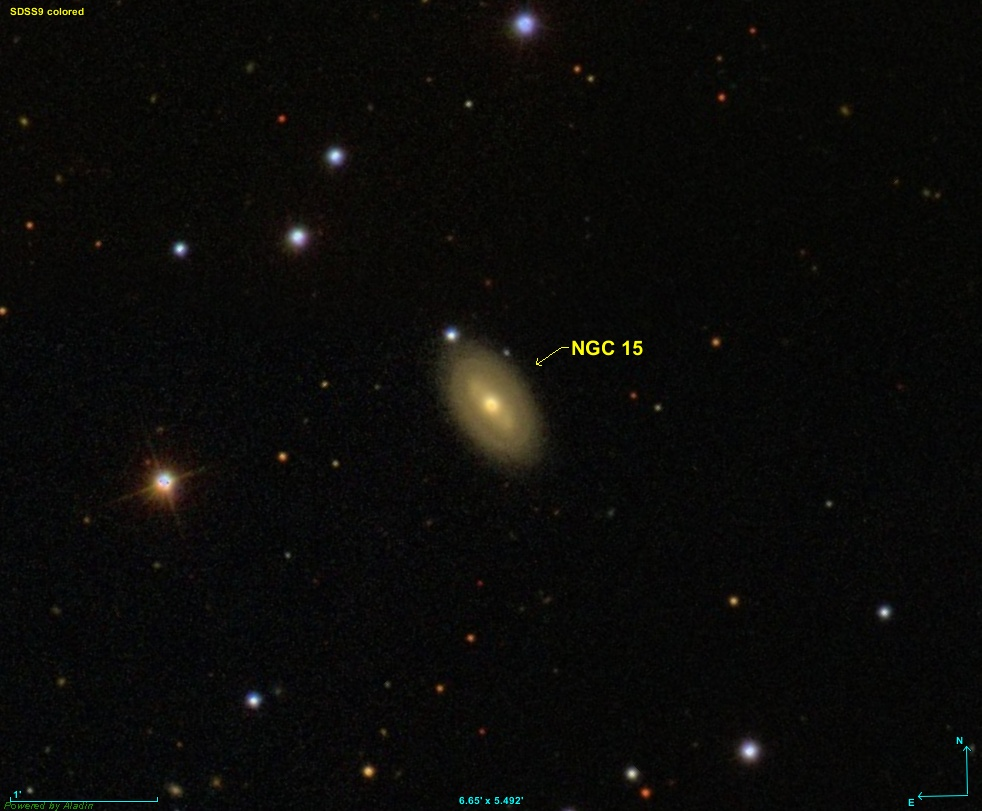
- NGC 15 in the Sloan Digital Sky Survey

Observation data (J 2000.0 epoch)
- Constellation: Pegasus
- Right ascension: 00^{h} 09^{m} 02.5^{s}
- Declination: +21° 37′ 27″
- Redshift: 0.021121
- Heliocentric radial velocity: 6332 ± 10 km/s
- Apparent magnitude (V): 14.67
- Absolute magnitude (V): -20.43

Characteristics
- Type: Sa
- Apparent size (V): 1.072′ × 0.575′

Other designations
- UGC 00082, PGC 000661.

NGC 15 is a spiral galaxy located in the constellation Pegasus. It was discovered by Albert Marth on October 30, 1864.

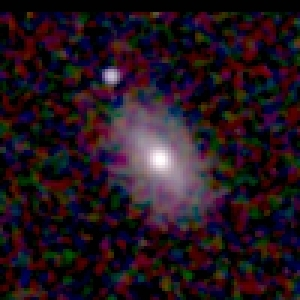
NGC 15 (near-infrared)

== See also ==
- NGC 14
- NGC 16
- PGC
- NGC
- List of NGC objects (1–1000)
- List of NGC objects
