= NGC 14 =

Irregular galaxy in the constellation Pegasus

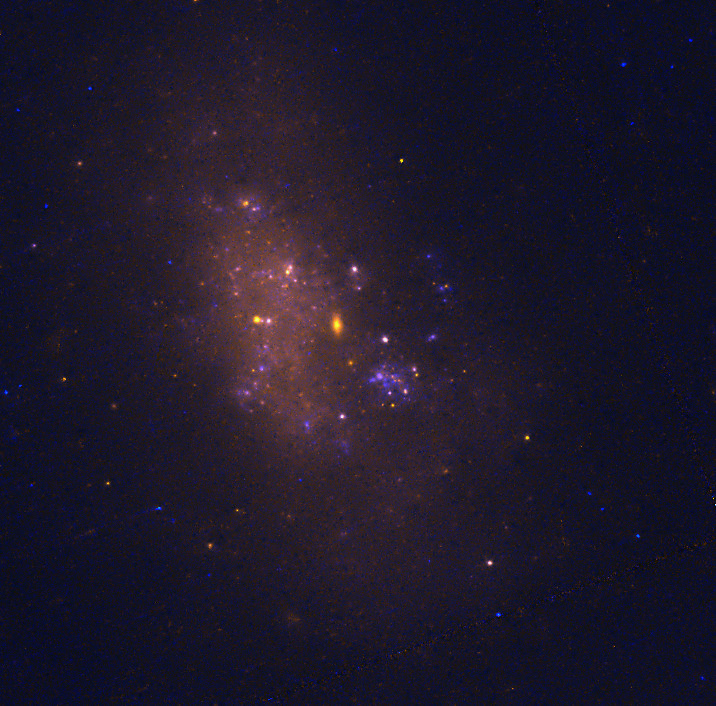
- NGC 14

Observation data (J 2000.0 epoch)
- Constellation: Pegasus
- Right ascension: 00^{h} 08^{m} 46.4^{s}
- Declination: +15° 48′ 59″
- Redshift: 0.002885
- Heliocentric radial velocity: 865 ± 1 km/s
- Distance: 47.1 Mly (12.8 Mpc)
- Apparent magnitude (V): 12.71
- Absolute magnitude (V): −17.24

Characteristics
- Type: (R)IB(s)m pec
- Apparent size (V): 1.995′ × 1.349′

Other designations
- UGC 75, PGC 647, Arp 235

NGC 14 is an irregular galaxy in the constellation Pegasus. It was included in Halton Arp's Atlas of Peculiar Galaxies, under the section "Galaxies with the appearance of fission," since the irregular appearance of this galaxy causes it to look like it is coming apart. It was discovered on September 18, 1786, by William Herschel.

== See also ==
- NGC 15
- NGC 13
- NGC
- List of NGC objects (1–1000)
- List of NGC objects
