= NGC 16 =

Galaxy in the constellation Pegasus

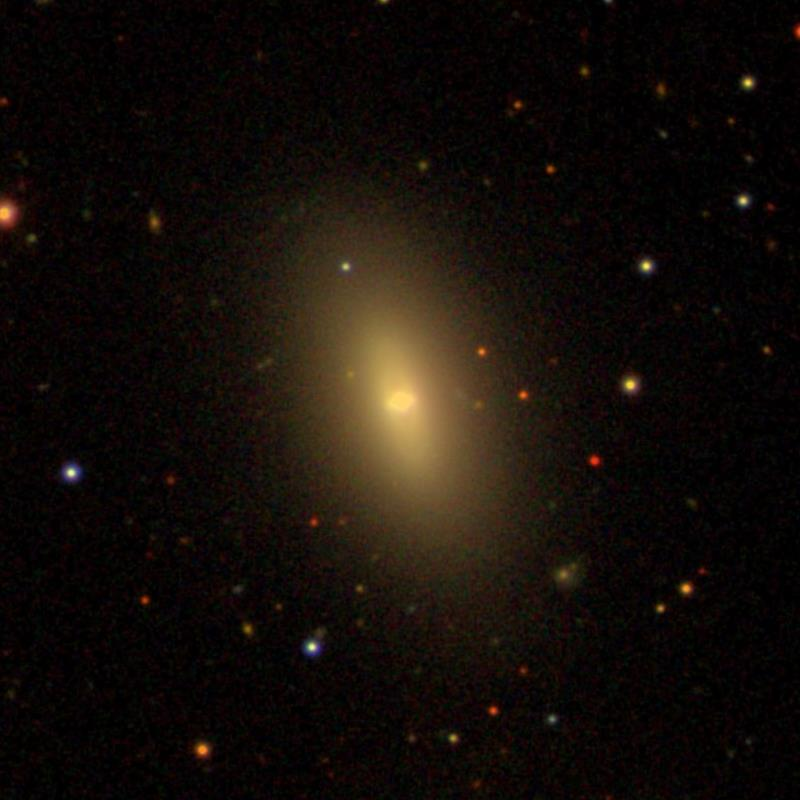
- NGC 16 (Sloan Digital Sky Survey)

Observation data (J2000.0 epoch)
- Constellation: Pegasus
- Right ascension: 00^{h} 09^{m} 04.3^{s}
- Declination: +27° 43′ 45″
- Redshift: 0.010340
- Heliocentric radial velocity: 3100 ± 17 km/s
- Apparent magnitude (V): 13.0
- Absolute magnitude (V): −20.62

Characteristics
- Type: SAB0^{−}
- Apparent size (V): 1.8′ × 1.0′

Other designations
- UGC 80, MCG +04-01-032, PGC 660

NGC 16 is a lenticular galaxy located in the constellation Pegasus. It was discovered on September 8, 1784, by William Herschel.

In the Webb Society Deep-Sky Observer's Handbook, the visual appearance of NGC 16 is described as follows:

Round, with a slightly brighter centre; the outer nebulosity is of uniform surface brightness.

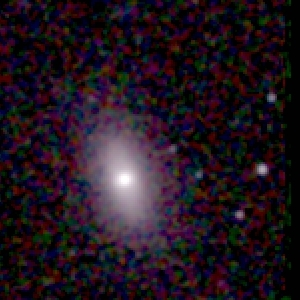
NGC 16 in near-infrared

== See also ==
- NGC 15
- NGC 17
- NGC
- List of NGC objects (1–1000)
- List of NGC objects
- Galaxy
