= Orders of magnitude (length) =

Comparison of a wide range of lengths

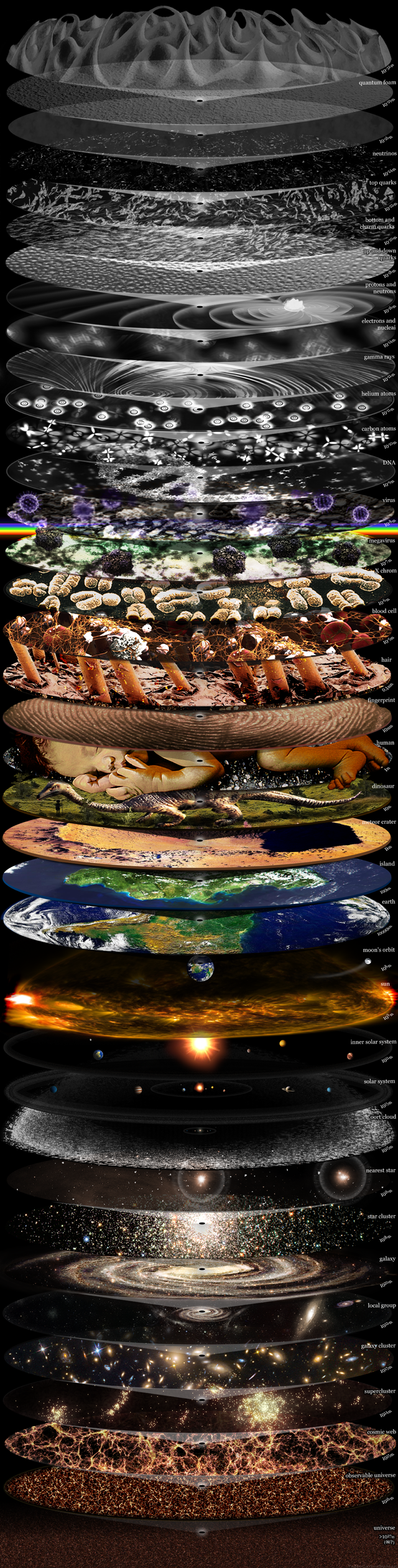
Objects of sizes in different order of magnitude (at inconsistent intervals)

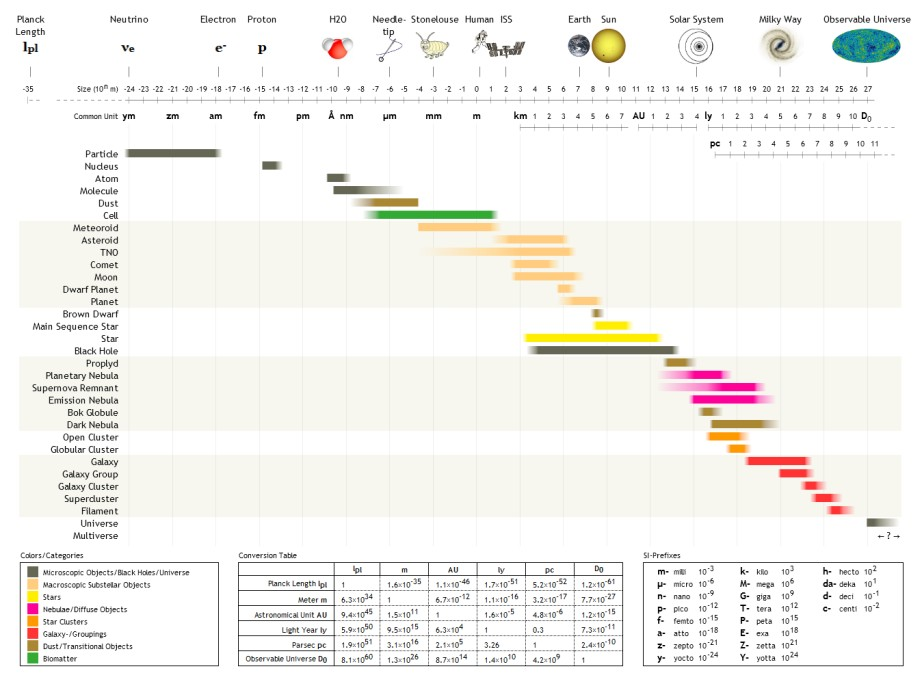
Graphical overview of sizes.

The following are examples of orders of magnitude for different lengths.

== Overview ==
Scale	Range (m)		Unit	Example items
Scale	≥	<	Unit	Example items
Subatomic	–	0	–	Gravitational singularity
Subatomic	10^{−36}	10^{−33}	ℓ_{P}	Fixed value (not a range). Quantum foam, string
Subatomic	10^{−18}	10^{−15}	am	Proton, neutron, pion
Atomic to cellular	10^{−15}	10^{−12}	fm	Atomic nucleus
Atomic to cellular	10^{−12}	10^{−9}	pm	Wavelength of gamma rays and X-rays, hydrogen atom
Atomic to cellular	10^{−9}	10^{−6}	nm	DNA helix, virus, wavelength of optical spectrum, transistors used in CPUs
Cellular to human	10^{−6}	10^{−3}	μm	Bacterium, fog water droplet, human hair's diameter (Note: The diametre of human hair ranges from 17 to 181 μm Ley, Brian (1999). Elert, Glenn (ed.). "Diametre of a human hair". The Physics Factbook.)
Cellular to human	10^{−3}	1	mm	Mosquito, golf ball, domestic cat, violin, football
Human to astronomical	1	10^{3}	m	Piano, human, automobile, african bush elephant, sperm whale, football field, Eiffel Tower
Human to astronomical	10^{3}	10^{6}	km	Mount Everest, length of Panama Canal and Trans-Siberian Railway, larger asteroid
Astronomical	10^{6}	10^{9}	Mm	The Moon, Earth, one light-second
Astronomical	10^{9}	10^{12}	Gm	Sun, one light-minute, Earth's orbit
Astronomical	10^{12}	10^{15}	Tm	Orbits of outer planets, Solar System
Astronomical	10^{15}	10^{18}	Pm	A light-year, the distance to Proxima Centauri
Astronomical	10^{18}	10^{21}	Em	Galactic arm
Astronomical	10^{21}	10^{24}	Zm	Milky Way, distance to Andromeda Galaxy
Astronomical	10^{24}	10^{27}	Ym	Huge-LQG, Hercules–Corona Borealis Great Wall, Observable universe

== Detailed list ==
To help compare different orders of magnitude, the following list describes various lengths between $1.6 \times 10^{-35}$ metres and $10^{10^{10^{122}}}$metres. Metres are used in these tables to provide a common reference point, but metric prefixes above "k" are not commonly used with metres. So for example, 1.21 Gm would more commonly be written as 1.21 million km or (in scientific notation) 1.21 × 10^{6} km. Interplanetary distances are also commonly measured in astronomical units. Distances on the interstellar or larger scale are typically measured in light-years or parsecs.

=== Subatomic scale ===
Factor (m)	Multiple	Value	Item
0	0	0	Singularity
10^{−35}	1 Planck length	0.0000162 qm	Planck length; typical scale of hypothetical loop quantum gravity or size of a hypothetical string and of branes; according to string theory, lengths smaller than this do not make any physical sense. Quantum foam is thought to exist at this scale.
10^{−24}	1 yoctometre (ym)	142 ym	Effective cross section radius of 1 MeV neutrinos
10^{−21}	1 zeptometre (zm)		Preons, hypothetical particles proposed as subcomponents of quarks and leptons; the upper bound for the width of a cosmic string in string theory
10^{−21}	1 zeptometre (zm)	7 zm	Effective cross section radius of high-energy neutrinos
10^{−21}	1 zeptometre (zm)	310 zm	De Broglie wavelength of protons at the Large Hadron Collider (4 TeV as of 2012)
10^{−18}	1 attometre (am)		Upper limit for the size of quarks and electrons
10^{−18}	1 attometre (am)		Sensitivity of the LIGO detector for gravitational waves
10^{−18}	1 attometre (am)		Upper bound of the typical size range for "fundamental strings"
10^{−17}	10 am		Range of the weak force
10^{−16}	100 am	850 am	Approximate charge radius of the proton

=== Atomic to cellular scale ===
Factor (m)	Multiple	Value	Item
10^{−15}	1 femtometre (fm, fermi)	1 fm	Approximate limit of the gluon-mediated color force between quarks
10^{−15}	1 femtometre (fm, fermi)	1.5 fm	Effective cross section radius of an 11 MeV proton
10^{−15}	1 femtometre (fm, fermi)	2.81794 fm	Classical electron radius
10^{−15}	1 femtometre (fm, fermi)	3 fm	Approximate limit of the meson-mediated nuclear binding force
10^{−15}	1 femtometre (fm, fermi)	750 to 822.25 fm	Longest wavelength of gamma rays
10^{−12}	1 picometre (pm)	1.75 to 15 fm	Diameter range of the atomic nucleus
10^{−12}	1 picometre (pm)	1 pm	Distance between atomic nuclei in a white dwarf
10^{−12}	1 picometre (pm)	2.4 pm	Compton wavelength of electron
10^{−12}	1 picometre (pm)	5 pm	Wavelength of shortest X-rays
10^{−11}	10 pm	28 pm	Radius of helium atom
10^{−11}	10 pm	53 pm	Bohr radius (radius of a hydrogen atom)
10^{−10}	100 pm	100 pm	1 ångström (also covalent radius of sulfur atom)
10^{−10}	100 pm	154 pm	Length of a typical covalent bond (C–C)
10^{−10}	100 pm	280 pm	Average size of the water molecule (actual lengths may vary)
10^{−10}	100 pm	500 pm	Width of protein α helix
10^{−9}	1 nanometre (nm)	1 nm	Diameter of a carbon nanotube diameter of smallest transistor gate (as of 2016)
10^{−9}	1 nanometre (nm)	2 nm	Diameter of the DNA helix
10^{−9}	1 nanometre (nm)	2.5 nm	Smallest microprocessor transistor gate oxide thickness (as of January 2007)
10^{−9}	1 nanometre (nm)	3.4 nm	Length of a DNA turn (10 bp)
10^{−9}	1 nanometre (nm)	6–10 nm	Thickness of cell membrane
10^{−8}	10 nm	10 nm	Upper range of thickness of cell wall in Gram-negative bacteria
10^{−8}	10 nm	10 nm	As of 2016, 10 nanometres was the smallest semiconductor device fabrication node
10^{−8}	10 nm	40 nm	Extreme ultraviolet wavelength
10^{−8}	10 nm	50 nm	Flying height of the head of a hard disk
10^{−7}	100 nm	121.6 nm	Wavelength of the Lyman-alpha line
10^{−7}	100 nm	120 nm	Typical diameter of the human immunodeficiency virus (HIV)
10^{−7}	100 nm	400–700 nm	Approximate wavelength range of visible light

=== Cellular to human scale ===
Factor (m)	Multiple	Value	Item
10^{−6}	1 micrometre (μm) (also called 1 micron)	1–4 μm	Typical length of a bacterium
10^{−6}	1 micrometre (μm) (also called 1 micron)	4 μm	Typical diameter of spider silk
10^{−6}	1 micrometre (μm) (also called 1 micron)	7 μm	Typical size of a red blood cell
10^{−5}	10 μm	10 μm	Typical size of a fog, mist, or cloud water droplet
10^{−5}	10 μm	10 μm	Width of transistors in the Intel 4004, the world's first commercial microprocessor
10^{−5}	10 μm	12 μm	Width of acrylic fiber
10^{−5}	10 μm	17–181 μm	Width range of human hair
10^{−4}	100 μm	340 μm	Size of a pixel on a 17-inch monitor with a resolution of 1024×768
10^{−4}	100 μm	560 μm	Thickness of the central area of a human cornea or, diameter of a grain of salt.
10^{−4}	100 μm	750 μm	Maximum diameter of Thiomargarita namibiensis, the second largest bacterium ever discovered
10^{−3}	1 millimetre (mm)	~5 mm	Length of an average flea is 1–10 mm (usually <5 mm)
10^{−3}	1 millimetre (mm)	2.54 mm	One-tenth inch; distance between pins in DIP (dual-inline-package) electronic components
10^{−3}	1 millimetre (mm)	5.70 mm	Approximate diameter of the projectile in 5.56×45 mm NATO ammunition
10^{−2}	1 centimetre (cm)	20 mm	Approximate width of an adult human finger
10^{−2}	1 centimetre (cm)	54 mm × 86 mm	Dimensions of a credit card, according to the ISO/IEC 7810 ID-1 standard
10^{−2}	1 centimetre (cm)	73–75 mm	Diameter of a baseball, according to Major League Baseball guidelines
10^{−1}	1 decimetre (dm)	120 mm	Diameter of a compact disc
10^{−1}	1 decimetre (dm)	660 mm	Length of the longest pine cones, produced by the sugar pine
10^{−1}	1 decimetre (dm)	900 mm	Average length of a rapier, a fencing sword

=== Human to astronomical scale ===
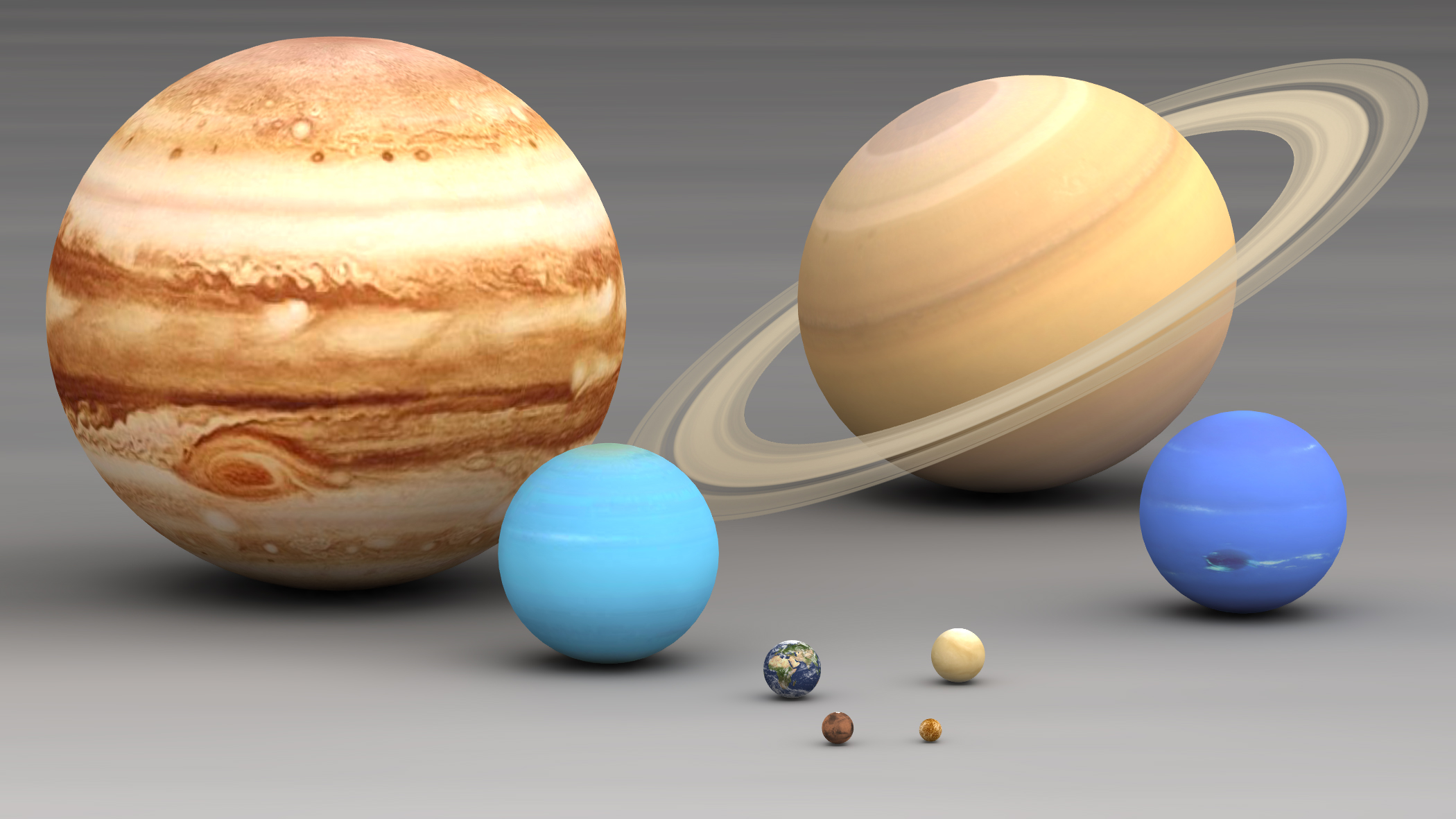
Planets of the Solar System to scale

Factor (m)	Multiple	Value	Item
1 (10^{0})	1 metre (m)	1 m (exactly)	Since 2019, defined as the length of the path travelled by light in a vacuum during a time interval of 1/299,792,458 of a second, where the second is defined by a hyperfine transition frequency of caesium.
1 (10^{0})	1 metre (m)	2.72 m	Height of Robert Wadlow, tallest-known human.
1 (10^{0})	1 metre (m)	8.38 m	Length of a London bus (AEC Routemaster)
10^{1}	1 decametre (dam)	33 m	Length of the longest known blue whale
10^{1}	1 decametre (dam)	52 m	Height of the Niagara Falls
10^{1}	1 decametre (dam)	93.47 m	Height of the Statue of Liberty
10^{2}	1 hectometre (hm)	105 m	Length of a typical football field
10^{2}	1 hectometre (hm)	137 m (147 m)	Height (present and original) of the Great Pyramid of Giza
10^{2}	1 hectometre (hm)	300 m	Height of the Eiffel Tower, one of the famous monuments of Paris
10^{2}	1 hectometre (hm)	979 m	Height of the Salto Angel in Venezuela, the world's highest free-falling waterfall
10^{3}	1 kilometre (km)	2.3 km	Length of the Three Gorges Dam, the largest dam in the world
10^{3}	1 kilometre (km)	3.1 km	Narrowest width of the Strait of Messina, separating Italy and Sicily
10^{3}	1 kilometre (km)	8.848 km	Height of Mount Everest, the highest mountain on Earth
10^{4}	10 km (1 Myriametre)	10.9 km	Depth of the Challenger Deep in the Mariana Trench, the deepest-known point on Earth's surface
10^{4}	10 km (1 Myriametre)	27 km	Circumference of the Large Hadron Collider, as of May 2010 (and still as of November 2025) the largest and highest energy particle accelerator
10^{4}	10 km (1 Myriametre)	42.195 km	Length of a marathon
10^{5}	100 km	100 km	The distance the IAU considers to be the limit to space, called the Karman line
10^{5}	100 km	163 km	Length of the Suez Canal, connecting the Mediterranean Sea to the Red Sea
10^{5}	100 km	491 km	Length of the Pyrenees, the mountain range separating Spain and France
10^{5}	100 km	600 km	Thermosphere height
10^{5}	100 km	974.6 km	Greatest diameter of the dwarf planet Ceres.
10^{6}	1 megametre (Mm)	2.38 Mm	Diameter of dwarf planet Pluto, formerly the smallest planet category (Note: The exact category (asteroid, dwarf planet, or planet) to which particular Solar System objects belong, has been subject to some revision since the discovery of extrasolar planets and trans-Neptunian objects) in the Solar System
10^{6}	1 megametre (Mm)	3.48 Mm	Diameter of the Moon
10^{6}	1 megametre (Mm)	5.2 Mm	Typical distance covered by the winner of the 24 Hours of Le Mans automobile endurance race
10^{6}	1 megametre (Mm)	6.259 Mm	Length of the Great Wall of China
10^{6}	1 megametre (Mm)	6.371 Mm	Average radius of Earth
10^{6}	1 megametre (Mm)	6.378 Mm	Equatorial radius of Earth
10^{6}	1 megametre (Mm)	6.6 Mm	Approximate length of the two longest rivers, the Nile and the Amazon
10^{6}	1 megametre (Mm)	7.821 Mm	Length of the Trans-Canada Highway
10^{6}	1 megametre (Mm)	9.288 Mm	Length of the Trans-Siberian Railway, longest in the world

=== Astronomical scale ===
Factor (m)	Multiple	Value	Item
10^{7}	10 Mm	12.756 Mm	Equatorial diameter of Earth
10^{7}	10 Mm	20.004 Mm	Length of a meridian on Earth (distance between Earth's poles along the surface)
10^{7}	10 Mm	40.075 Mm	Length of Earth's equator
10^{8}	100 Mm	142.984 Mm	Diameter of Jupiter
10^{8}	100 Mm	299.792 Mm	Distance traveled by light in vacuum in one second (a light-second, exactly 299,792,458 m by definition of the speed of light)
10^{8}	100 Mm	384.4 Mm	Moon's orbital distance from Earth
10^{9}	1 gigametre (Gm)	1.39 Gm	Diameter of the Sun
10^{9}	1 gigametre (Gm)	5.15 Gm	Greatest mileage ever recorded by a car (3.2 million miles by a 1966 Volvo P-1800S)
10^{10}	10 Gm	18 Gm	Approximately one light-minute
10^{11}	100 Gm	150 Gm	1 astronomical unit (au); mean distance between Earth and Sun
10^{12}	1 terametre (Tm)	1.3 Tm	Optical diameter of Betelgeuse
10^{12}	1 terametre (Tm)	1.4 Tm	Orbital distance of Saturn from Sun
10^{12}	1 terametre (Tm)	2 Tm	Estimated optical diameter of VY Canis Majoris, one of the largest-known stars
10^{12}	1 terametre (Tm)	5.9 Tm	Orbital distance of Pluto from the Sun
10^{12}	1 terametre (Tm)	~ 7.5 Tm	Outer boundary of the Kuiper belt
10^{13}	10 Tm		Diameter of the Solar System as a whole
10^{13}	10 Tm	16.09 Tm	Total length of DNA molecules in all cells of an adult human body
10^{13}	10 Tm	25.46 Tm	Distance of the Voyager 1 spacecraft from Sun (as of Dec 2025), the farthest man-made object so far
10^{13}	10 Tm	62.03 Tm	Estimated radius of the event horizon of the supermassive black hole in NGC 4889, the largest-known black hole to date
10^{14}	100 Tm	180 Tm	Size of the debris disk around the star 51 Ophiuchi
10^{15}	1 petametre (Pm)	~7.5 Pm	Supposed outer boundary of the Oort cloud (~ 50,000 au)
10^{15}	1 petametre (Pm)	9.461 Pm	Distance traveled by light in vacuum in one year; at its current speed, Voyager 1 would need 17,500 years to travel this distance
10^{16}	10 Pm	30.857 Pm	1 parsec
10^{16}	10 Pm	39.9 Pm	Distance to nearest star (Proxima Centauri)
10^{16}	10 Pm	41.3 Pm	As of December 2025, distance to nearest discovered extrasolar planet (Alpha Centauri Bc)
10^{17}	100 Pm	193 Pm	As of October 2010, distance to nearest discovered extrasolar planet with potential to support life as presently defined by science (Gliese 581 d)
10^{17}	100 Pm	615 Pm	Approximate radius of humanity's radio bubble, caused by high-power TV broadcasts leaking through the atmosphere into outer space
10^{18}	1 exametre (Em)	1.9 Em	Distance to nearby solar twin (HIP 56948), a star with properties virtually identical to the Sun
10^{19}	10 Em	9.46 Em	Average thickness of Milky Way Galaxy (1,000 to 3,000 ly by 21 cm observations)
10^{20}	100 Em	113.5 Em	Thickness of Milky Way Galaxy's gaseous disk
10^{21}	1 zettametre (Zm)		
10^{21}	1 zettametre (Zm)	1.54 Zm	Distance to SN 1987A, the most recent naked eye supernova
10^{21}	1 zettametre (Zm)	1.62 Zm	Distance to the Large Magellanic Cloud (a dwarf galaxy orbiting the Milky Way)
10^{21}	1 zettametre (Zm)	1.66 Zm	Distance to the Small Magellanic Cloud (another dwarf galaxy orbiting the Milky Way)
10^{21}	1 zettametre (Zm)	1.9 Zm	Diameter of galactic disk of Milky Way Galaxy
10^{21}	1 zettametre (Zm)	6.15 Zm	Diameter of the low surface brightness disc halo of the giant spiral galaxy Malin 1
10^{22}	10 Zm	13.25 Zm	Radius of the diffuse stellar halo of IC 1101, one of the largest-known galaxies
10^{22}	10 Zm	24 Zm	Distance to Andromeda Galaxy
10^{22}	10 Zm	30.857 Zm	1 megaparsec
10^{22}	10 Zm	50 Zm	Diameter of Local Group of galaxies
10^{23}	100 Zm	300–600 Zm	Distance to Virgo Cluster of galaxies
10^{24}	1 yottametre (Ym)	2.19 Ym	Diameter of the Local Supercluster and the largest voids and filaments
10^{24}	1 yottametre (Ym)	2.8 Ym	End of Greatness
10^{24}	1 yottametre (Ym)	~5 Ym	Diameter of the Horologium Supercluster
10^{24}	1 yottametre (Ym)	9.461 Ym	Diameter of the Pisces–Cetus Supercluster Complex, the supercluster complex which includes Earth
10^{25}	10 Ym	13 Ym	Length of the Sloan Great Wall, a giant wall of galaxies (galactic filament)
10^{25}	10 Ym	30.857 Ym	1 gigaparsec
10^{25}	10 Ym	37.84 Ym	Length of the Huge-LQG, a group of 73 quasars
10^{26}	100 Ym	95 Ym	Estimated light travel distance to certain quasars. Length of the Hercules–Corona Borealis Great Wall, a colossal wall of galaxies, the largest and the most massive structure in the observable universe as of 2014
10^{26}	100 Ym	127 Ym	Estimated light travel distance to GN-z11, the most distant object ever observed
10^{26}	100 Ym	870 Ym	Approximate diameter (comoving distance) of the visible universe
10^{27}	1 ronnametre (Rm)	1.2 Rm	Lower bound of the (possibly infinite) radius of the universe, if it is a 3-sphere, according to one estimate using the WMAP data at 95% confidence It equivalently implies that there are at minimum 21 particle horizon-sized volumes in the universe.
$10^{10^{115}}$ (Note: 10^{115} is 1 followed by 115 zeroes, or a googol multiplied by a quadrillion. 10^{10^{115}} is 1 followed by a quadrillion googol zeroes. 10^{10^{10^{122}}} is 1 followed by 10^{10^{122}} (a googolplex^{10 sextillion}) zeroes.)	$10^{10^{115}}$ m	$10^{10^{115}}$ m	According to the laws of probability, the distance one must travel until one encounters a volume of space identical to our observable universe with conditions identical to our own.
$10^{10^{10^{122}}}$	$10^{10^{10^{122}}}$ m	$10^{10^{10^{122}}}$ m	Maximum size of universe after cosmological inflation, implied by one resolution of the No-Boundary Proposal

== 1 quectometre and less ==
The quectometre (SI symbol: qm) is a unit of length in the metric system equal to 10^{−30} metres. To help compare different orders of magnitude, this section lists lengths equal to or shorter than 10^{−30} m (1 qm).

- 0 quectometres (0 meters) — gravitational singularity
- 1.6 × 10^{−5} quectometres (1.6 × 10^{−35} metres) – the Planck length (Measures of distance shorter than this do not make physical sense, according to current theories of physics.)
- 1 qm – 1 quectometre, the smallest named subdivision of the metre in the SI base unit of length, one nonillionth of a metre.

== 1 rontometre ==
The rontometre (SI symbol: rm) is a unit of length in the metric system equal to 10^{−27} metres.

== 10 rontometres ==
- 10 rm – the length of one side of a square whose area is one shed, a unit of target cross section used in nuclear physics

== 1 yoctometre ==
The yoctometre (SI symbol: ym) is a unit of length in the metric system equal to 10^{−24} metres.

- 2 ym – the effective cross-section radius of 1 MeV neutrinos as measured by Clyde Cowan and Frederick Reines.

== 1 zeptometre ==
The zeptometre (SI symbol: zm) is a unit of length in the metric system equal to 10^{−21} metres. To help compare different orders of magnitude, this section lists lengths between 10^{−21} m and 10^{−20} m (1 zm and 10 zm).

- 2 zm – the upper bound for the width of a cosmic string in string theory.
- 2 zm – radius of effective cross section for a 20 GeV neutrino scattering off a nucleon
- 7 zm – radius of effective cross section for a 250 GeV neutrino scattering off a nucleon

== 100 zeptometres ==
To help compare different orders of magnitude, this section lists lengths between 10^{−19} m and 10^{−18} m (100 zm and 1 am).

- 177 zm – de Broglie wavelength of protons at the Large Hadron Collider (7 TeV as of 2010)

== 1 attometre ==
The attometre (SI symbol: am) is a unit of length in the metric system equal to 10^{−18} metres. To help compare different orders of magnitude, this section lists lengths between 10^{−18} m and 10^{−17} m (1 am and 10 am).

- 1 am – sensitivity of the LIGO detector for gravitational waves
- 1 am – upper limit for the size of quarks and electrons

== 10 attometres ==
To help compare different orders of magnitude, this section lists lengths between 10^{−17} m and 10^{−16} m (10 am and 100 am).

- 10–100 am – range of the weak force
- 86 am – charge radius of a Bottom eta meson

== 100 attometres ==
To help compare different orders of magnitude, this section lists lengths between 10^{−16} m and 10^{−15} m (100 am and 1 fm).

- 831 am – approximate proton radius

== 1 femtometre (or 1 fermi) ==
The femtometre (SI symbol: fm) is a unit of length in the metric system equal to 10^{−15} metres. In particle physics, this unit is sometimes called a fermi, also with abbreviation "fm". To help compare different orders of magnitude, this section lists lengths between 10^{−15} metres and 10^{−14} metres (1 femtometre and 10 fm).

- 1 fm – diameter of a neutron, approximate range-limit of the color force carried between quarks by gluons
- 1.5 fm – diameter of the scattering cross section of an 11 MeV proton with a target proton
- 1.75 fm – the effective charge diameter of a proton
- 2.81794 fm – classical electron radius
- 3 fm – approximate range-limit of the nuclear binding force mediated by mesons
- 7 fm – the radius of the effective scattering cross section for a gold nucleus scattering a 6 MeV alpha particle over 140 degrees

== 10 femtometres ==
To help compare different orders of magnitude, this section lists lengths between 10^{−14} m and 10^{−13} m (10 fm and 100 fm).

- 1.75 to 15 fm – diameter range of the atomic nucleus
- 10 fm – the length of one side of a square whose area is one barn (10^{−28} m^{2}), a unit of target cross section used in nuclear physics
- 30.8568 fm – 1 quectoparsec (10^{−30} parsecs)

== 100 femtometres ==
To help compare different orders of magnitude, this section lists lengths between 10^{−13} m and 10^{−12} m (100 fm and 1 pm).

- 570 fm – typical distance from the atomic nucleus of the two innermost electrons (electrons in the 1s shell) in the uranium atom, the heaviest naturally occurring atom

== 1 picometre ==
The picometre (SI symbol: pm) is a unit of length in the metric system equal to 10^{−12} metres (1/1000000000000 m = 0.000000000001 m). To help compare different orders of magnitude this section lists lengths between 10^{−12} and 10^{−11} m (1 pm and 10 pm).

- 1 pm – distance between atomic nuclei in a white dwarf
- 1 pm – reference value of particle displacement in acoustics
- 2.4 pm – the Compton wavelength of an electron
- 5 pm – shorter X-ray wavelengths (approx.)

== 10 picometres ==
To help compare different orders of magnitude this section lists lengths between 10^{−11} and 10^{−10} m (10 pm and 100 pm).

- 25 pm – approximate radius of a helium atom, the smallest neutral atom
- 30.8568 pm – 1 rontoparsec
- 50 pm – Bohr radius: approximate radius of a hydrogen atom
- ~50 pm – best resolution of a high-resolution transmission electron microscope
- 60 pm – radius of a carbon atom
- 93 pm – length of a diatomic carbon molecule
- 96 pm – H–O bond length in a water molecule

== 100 picometres ==
To help compare different orders of magnitude this section lists lengths between 10^{−10} and 10^{−9} m (100 pm and 1 nm; 1 Å and 10 Å).

- 100 pm – 1 ångström
- 100 pm – covalent radius of sulfur atom
- 120 pm – van der Waals radius of a neutral hydrogen atom
- 120 pm – radius of a gold atom
- 126 pm – covalent radius of ruthenium atom
- 135 pm – covalent radius of technetium atom
- 150 pm – length of a typical covalent bond (C–C)
- 153 pm – covalent radius of silver atom
- 155 pm – covalent radius of zirconium atom
- 175 pm – covalent radius of thulium atom
- 200 pm – highest resolution of a typical electron microscope
- 225 pm – covalent radius of caesium atom
- 280 pm – average size of the water molecule
- 298 pm – radius of a caesium atom, calculated to be the largest atomic radius
- 340 pm – thickness of single layer graphene
- 356.68 pm – width of diamond unit cell
- 403 pm – width of lithium fluoride unit cell
- 500 pm – width of protein α helix
- 543 pm – silicon lattice spacing
- 560 pm – width of sodium chloride unit cell
- 700 pm – width of glucose molecule
- 700 pm – diameter of a buckyball
- 780 pm – mean width of quartz unit cell
- 820 pm – mean width of ice unit cell
- 900 pm – mean width of coesite unit cell

== 1 nanometre ==
The nanometre (SI symbol: nm) is a unit of length in the metric system equal to 10^{−9} metres (1/1000000000 m = 0.000000001 m). To help compare different orders of magnitude, this section lists lengths between 10^{−9} and 10^{−8} m (1 nm and 10 nm).

- 1 nm – diameter of a carbon nanotube
- 1 nm – roughly the length of a sucrose molecule, calculated by Albert Einstein
- 2.3 nm – length of a phospholipid
- 2.3 nm – smallest gate oxide thickness in microprocessors
- 3 nm – width of a DNA helix
- 3 nm – flying height of the head of a hard disk
- 3 nm – the average half-pitch of a memory cell manufactured circa 2022
- 3.4 nm – length of a DNA turn (10 bp)
- 3.8 nm – size of an albumin molecule
- 5 nm – size of the gate length of a 16 nm processor
- 5 nm – the average half-pitch of a memory cell manufactured circa 2019–2020
- 6 nm – length of a phospholipid bilayer
- 6–10 nm – thickness of cell membrane
- 6.8 nm – width of a hemoglobin molecule
- 7 nm – diameter of actin filaments
- 7 nm – the average half-pitch of a memory cell manufactured circa 2018
- 10 nm – thickness of cell wall in Gram-negative bacteria

== 10 nanometres ==
Comparison of sizes of semiconductor manufacturing process nodes with some microscopic objects and visible light wavelengths. At this scale, the width of a human hair is about 10 times that of the image.

To help compare different orders of magnitude this section lists lengths between 10^{−8} and 10^{−7} m (10 nm and 100 nm).

- 10 nm – shortest extreme ultraviolet wavelength or longest X-ray wavelength
- 10 nm – the average length of a nanowire
- 10 nm – lower size of tobacco smoke
- 10 nm – the average half-pitch of a memory cell manufactured circa 2016 –2017
- 13 nm – the length of the wavelength that is used for EUV lithography
- 14 nm – length of a porcine circovirus
- 14 nm – the average half-pitch of a memory cell manufactured circa 2013
- 15 nm – length of an antibody
- 18 nm – diameter of tobacco mosaic virus (Generally, viruses range in size from 20 nm to 450 nm.)
- 20 nm – length of a nanobe, could be one of the smallest forms of life
- 20–80 nm – thickness of cell wall in Gram-positive bacteria
- 20 nm – thickness of bacterial flagellum
- 22 nm – the average half-pitch of a memory cell manufactured circa 2011–2012
- 22 nm – smallest feature size of production microprocessors in September 2009
- 25 nm – diameter of a microtubule
- 30 nm – lower size of cooking oil smoke
- 30.8568 nm – 1 yoctoparsec
- 32 nm – the average half-pitch of a memory cell manufactured circa 2009–2010
- 40 nm – extreme ultraviolet wavelength
- 45 nm – the average half-pitch of a memory cell manufactured circa 2007–2008
- 50 nm – upper size for airborne virus particles
- 50 nm – flying height of the head of a hard disk
- 65 nm – the average half-pitch of a memory cell manufactured circa 2005–2006
- 58 nm – height of a T7 bacteriophage
- 90 nm – human immunodeficiency virus (HIV) (generally, viruses range in size from 20 nm to 450 nm)
- 90 nm – the average half-pitch of a memory cell manufactured circa 2002–2003
- 100 nm – length of a mesoporous silica nanoparticle

== 100 nanometres ==
Comparison of sizes of semiconductor manufacturing process nodes with some microscopic objects and visible light wavelengths. At this scale, the width of a human hair is about 10 times that of the image.

To help compare different orders of magnitude, this section lists lengths between 10^{−7} and 10^{−6} m (100 nm and 1 μm).

- 100 nm – greatest particle size that can fit through a surgical mask
- 100 nm – 90% of particles in wood smoke are smaller than this.
- 120 nm – greatest particle size that can fit through a ULPA filter
- 120 nm – diameter of a human immunodeficiency virus (HIV)
- 120 nm – approximate diameter of SARS-CoV-2
- 125 nm – standard depth of pits on compact discs (width: 500 nm, length: 850 nm to 3.5 μm)
- 180 nm – typical length of the rabies virus
- 200 nm — typical diameter of the chickenpox virus
- 200 nm – typical size of a Mycoplasma bacterium, among the smallest bacteria
- 300 nm – greatest particle size that can fit through a HEPA (high efficiency particulate air) filter (N100 removes up to 99.97% at 300 nm, N95 removes up to 95% at 300 nm)
- 300–400 nm – near ultraviolet wavelength
- 400 nm – length of the capsid of a Mimivirus, one of the largest and most complex viruses.
- 400–420 nm – wavelength of violet light (see Color and Visible spectrum)
- 420–440 nm – wavelength of indigo light
- 440–500 nm – wavelength of blue light
- 500–520 nm – wavelength of cyan light
- 520–565 nm – wavelength of green light
- 565–590 nm – wavelength of yellow light
- 590–625 nm – wavelength of orange light
- 625–700 nm – wavelength of red light
- 700 nm–1.4 μm – wavelength of near-infrared radiation

== 1 micrometre (or 1 micron) ==
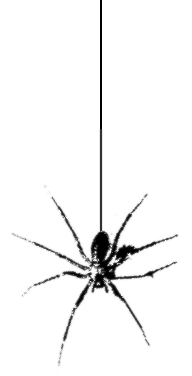
The silk for a spider's web is 5–7 μm (0.00020–0.00028 in) wide.

The micrometre (SI symbol: μm) is a unit of length in the metric system equal to 10^{−6} metres (1/1000000 m = 0.000001 m). To help compare different orders of magnitude, this section lists some items with lengths between 10^{−6} and 10^{−5} m (between 1 and 10 micrometres, or μm).

- ~0.7–300 μm – wavelength of infrared radiation
- 1 μm – the side of a square of area 10^{−12} m^{2}
- 1 μm – edge of cube of volume 10^{−18} m^{3} (1 fL)
- 1–10 μm – diameter of a typical bacterium
- 1 μm – length of a lysosome
- 1 μm – diameter of aerosol
- 1–2 μm – anthrax spore
- 2 μm – length of an average E. coli bacteria
- 3–4 μm – size of a typical yeast cell
- 5 μm – length of a typical human spermatozoon's head
- 6 μm – thickness of the tape in a 120-minute (C120) compact cassette
- 7 μm – diameter of the nucleus of a typical eukaryotic cell
- about 7 μm – diameter of human red blood cells
- 3–8 μm – width of strand of spider web silk
- 5–10 μm – width of a chloroplast
- 8–11 μm – size of a ground-level fog or mist droplet (Note: But not cloud or high-level fog droplets; droplet size increases with altitude. For a contradictory study indicating larger drop sizes even in ground fog, see Eldridge, Ralph G. (October 1961). "A Few Fog Drop-Size Distributions". Journal of Meteorology. 18 (5): 671–6. Bibcode:1961JAtS...18..671E. doi:10.1175/1520-0469(1961)018<0671:AFFDSD>2.0.CO;2.)
- 7–12 μm – the diameter of human white blood cells
- 8–10 μm – the diameter of human macrophages
- 8.4 μm – the diameter of a human neutrophil

== 10 micrometres ==
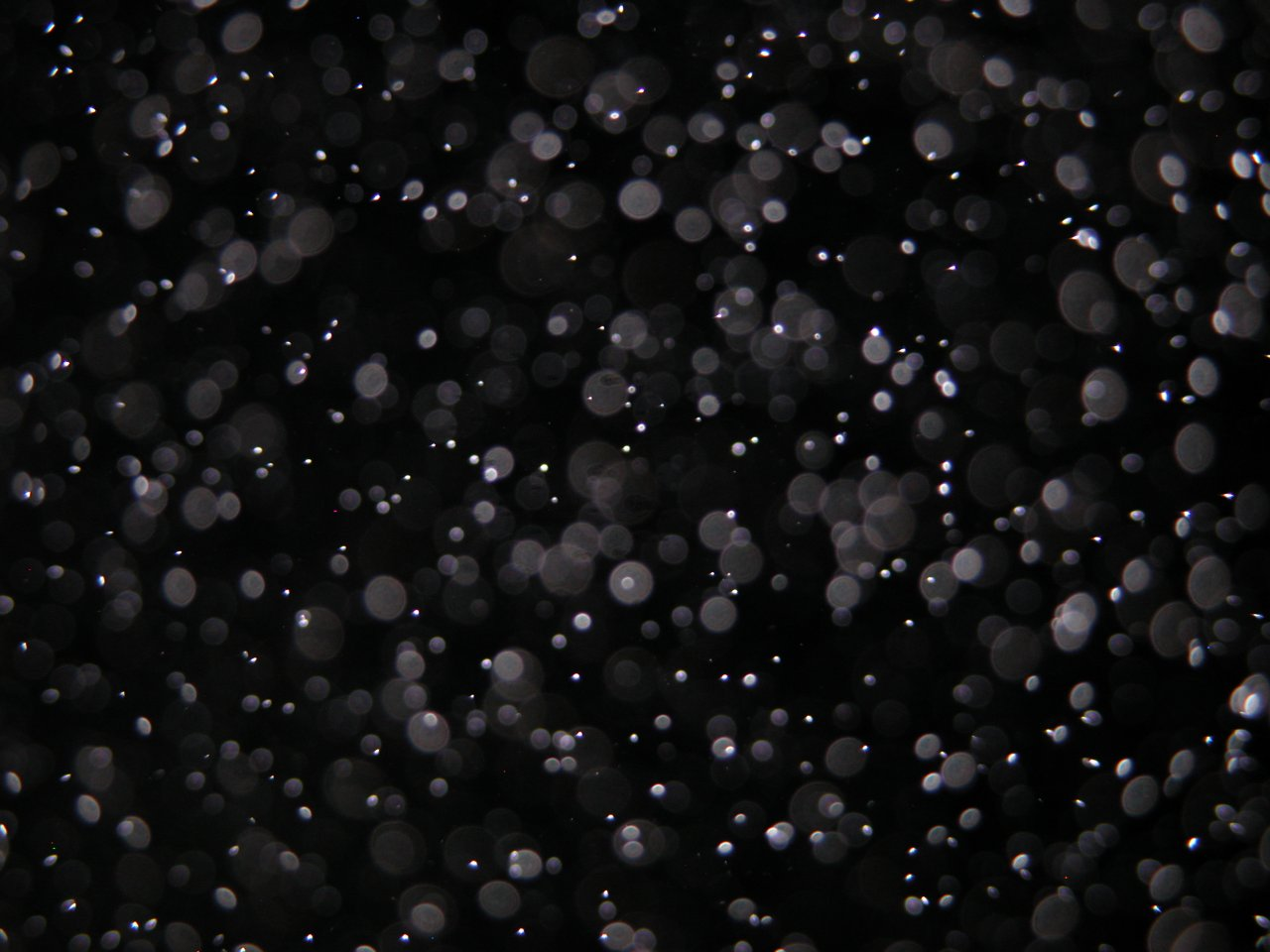
Fog particles are around 10–50 μm (0.00039–0.00197 in) long.

To help compare different orders of magnitude, this section lists lengths between 10^{−5} m and 10^{−4} m (10 μm and 100 μm).

- 10 μm – width of cotton fibre
- 10 μm – tolerance of the mold used to manufacture a Lego brick
- 10 μm – transistor width of the Intel 4004, the world's first commercial microprocessor
- 10 μm – mean longest dimension of a human red blood cell
- 5–20 μm – dust mite excreta
- 10.6 μm – wavelength of light emitted by a carbon dioxide laser
- 15 μm – width of silk fibre
- 17 μm – minimum width of a strand of human hair
- 17.6 μm – one twip, a unit of length in typography
- 10 to 55 μm – width of wool fibre
- 20 μm — diameter of a cloud droplet
- 25 μm — diameter of grass pollen
- 25.4 μm – 1/1,000 inch, commonly referred to as 1 mil in the U.S. and 1 thou in the U.K.
- 30 μm – length of a human skin cell
- 30.8568 μm – 1 zeptoparsec
- 50 μm – typical length of Euglena gracilis, a flagellate protist
- 50 μm – typical length of a human liver cell, an average-sized body cell
- 50 μm – length of a silt particle
- 60 μm – length of a human sperm cell
- 78 μm — width of a pixel on the display of the iPhone 4, marketed as Retina Display
- 70 to 180 μm – thickness of paper

== 100 micrometres ==
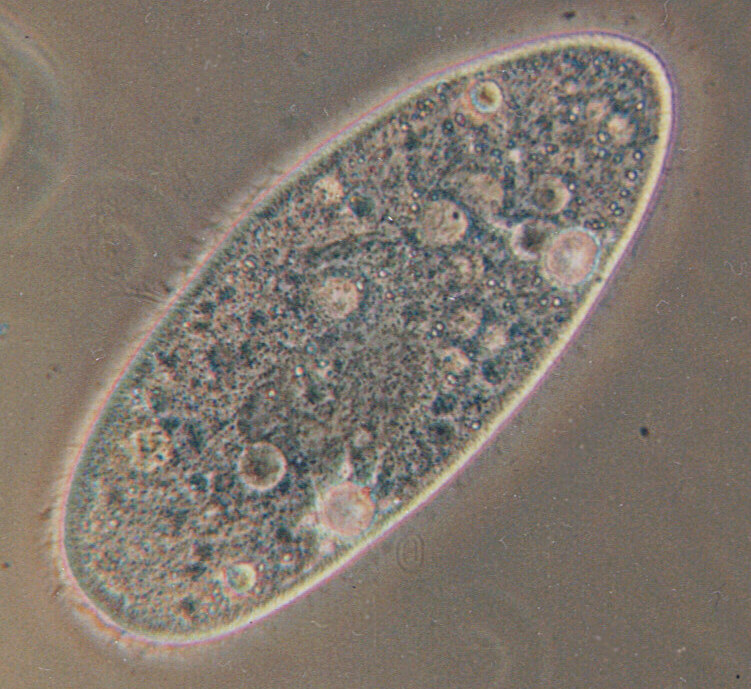
A paramecium is around 300 μm (0.012 in) long.

To help compare different orders of magnitude, this section lists lengths between 10^{−4} m and 10^{−3} m (100 μm and 1 mm). The term myriometre (abbr. mom, equivalent to 100 micrometres; frequently confused with the myriametre, 10 kilometres) is deprecated; the decimal metric prefix myrio- is obsolete and was not included among the prefixes when the International System of Units was introduced in 1960.

- 100 μm – 1/10 of a millimetre
- 100 μm – 0.00394 inches
- 100 μm – smallest distance that can be seen with the naked eye
- 100 μm – average diameter of a strand of human hair
- 100 μm – thickness of a coat of paint
- 100 μm – length of a dust particle
- 120 μm – the geometric mean of the Planck length and the diameter of the observable universe: √8.8 × 10^{26} m × 1.6 × 10^{−35} m
- 120 μm – diameter of a human ovum
- 139 µm - the size of Dicopomorpha echmepterygis, the smallest insect
- 170 μm – length of the largest mammalian sperm cell (rat)
- 170 μm – length of the largest sperm cell in nature, belonging to the Drosophila bifurca fruit fly
- 181 μm – maximum width of a strand of human hair
- 100–400 μm – length of Demodex mites living in human hair follicles
- 175–200 μm – typical thickness of a solar cell.
- 200 μm – typical length of Paramecium caudatum, a ciliate protist
- 200 μm – nominal width of the smallest commonly available mechanical pencil lead (0.2 mm)
- 250–300 μm – length of a dust mite
- 340 μm – length of a pixel on a 17-inch monitor with a resolution of 1024×768
- 500 μm – typical length of Amoeba proteus, an amoeboid protist
- 500 μm – length of a tardigrade
- 500 μm – MEMS micro-engine
- 500 μm – average length of a grain of sand
- 500 μm – average length of a grain of salt
- 500 μm – average length of a grain of sugar
- 560 μm – thickness of the central area of a human cornea
- 750 μm – diameter of a Thiomargarita namibiensis, which used to be considered the largest bacteria known
- 760 μm – thickness of an identification card

== 1 millimetre ==
An average red ant is about 5 mm (0.20 in) long.

The millimetre (SI symbol: mm) is a unit of length in the metric system equal to 10^{−3} metres (1/1000 m = 0.001 m). To help compare different orders of magnitude, this section lists lengths between 10^{−3} m and 10^{−2} m (1 mm and 1 cm).

- 1.0 mm – 1/1,000 of a metre
- 1.0 mm – 0.03937 inches or 5/127 (exactly)
- 1.0 mm – side of a square of area 1 mm²
- 1.0 mm – diameter of a pinhead
- 1.5 mm – average length of a flea
- 2 mm — diameter of an average rain droplet
- 2.54 mm – distance between pins on old dual in-line package (DIP) electronic components
- 5 mm – length of an average red ant
- 5 mm – diameter of an average grain of rice
- 5.56×45 mm NATO – standard ammunition size
- 6 mm – approximate width of a pencil
- 7 mm – length of a Paedophryne amauensis, the smallest-known vertebrate
- 7 mm – length of a human tooth
- 7.1 mm – length of a sunflower seed
- 7.62×51 mm NATO – common military ammunition size
- 8 mm – width of old-format home movie film
- 8 mm – length of a Paedocypris progenetica, the smallest-known fish

== 1 centimetre ==
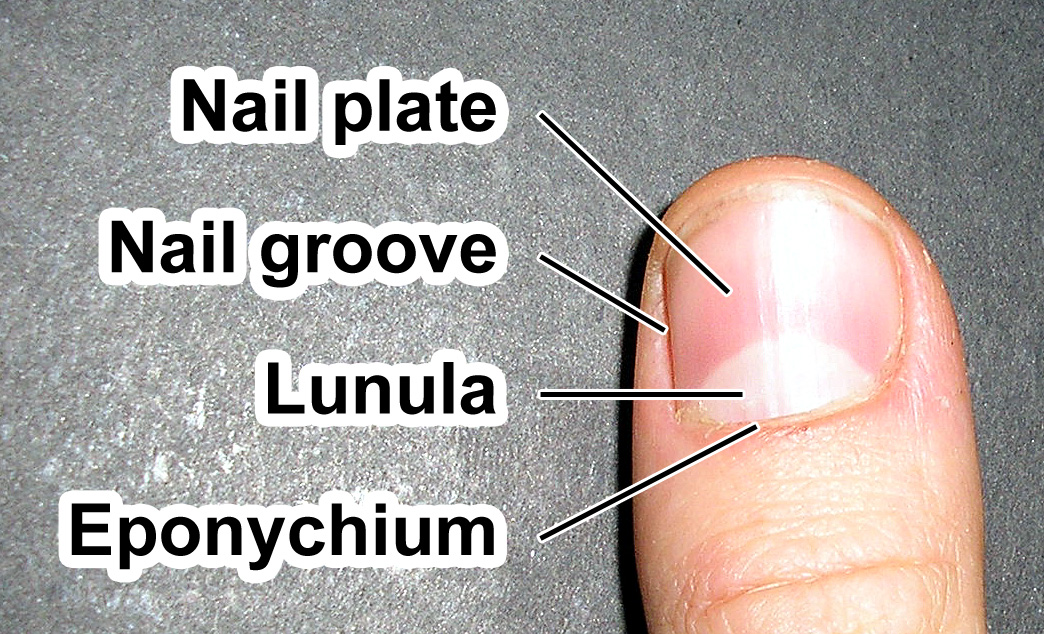
An average human fingernail is 1 cm (0.39 in) wide

The centimetre (SI symbol: cm) is a unit of length in the metric system equal to 10^{−2} metres (1/100 m = 0.01 m). To help compare different orders of magnitude, this section lists lengths between 10^{−2} m and 10^{−1} m (1 cm and 1 dm).

- 1 cm – 10 millimetres
- 1 cm – 0.39 inches
- 1 cm – edge of a square of area 1 cm^{2}
- 1 cm – edge of a cube of volume 1 mL
- 1 cm – length of a coffee bean
- 1 cm – approximate width of average fingernail
- 1.2 cm – length of a bee
- 1.2 cm – diameter of a die
- 1.5 cm – length of a very large mosquito
- 1.6 cm – length of a Jaragua Sphaero, a very small reptile
- 1.7 cm – length of a Thorius arboreus, the smallest salamander
- 1.77 cm – approximate diameter of a black hole the mass of earth.
- 2 cm – approximate width of an adult human finger
- 2 cm – upper bound of the length of the largest bacteria, the Thiomargarita magnifica.
- 2.4 cm – diameter of a human eye
- 2.54 cm – 1 inch
- 3.08568 cm – 1 attoparsec
- 3.4 cm – length of a quail egg
- 3.5 cm – width of film commonly used in motion pictures and still photography
- 3.78 cm – amount of distance the Moon moves away from Earth each year
- 4.3 cm – minimum diameter of a golf ball
- 5 cm – usual diameter of a chicken egg
- 5 cm – height of a Etruscan shrew, the smallest-known mammal
- 5.08 cm – 2 inches,
- 5.5 cm – height of a hummingbird, the smallest-known bird
- 5.5 × 5.5 × 5.5 cm – dimensions of a standard 3x3x3 Rubik's cube
- 6.1 cm – average height of an apple
- 7.3–7.5 cm – diameter of a baseball
- 8.6 cm × 5.4 cm – dimensions of a standard credit card (also called CR80)
- 9 cm – length of a speckled padloper, the smallest-known turtle

== 1 decimetre ==
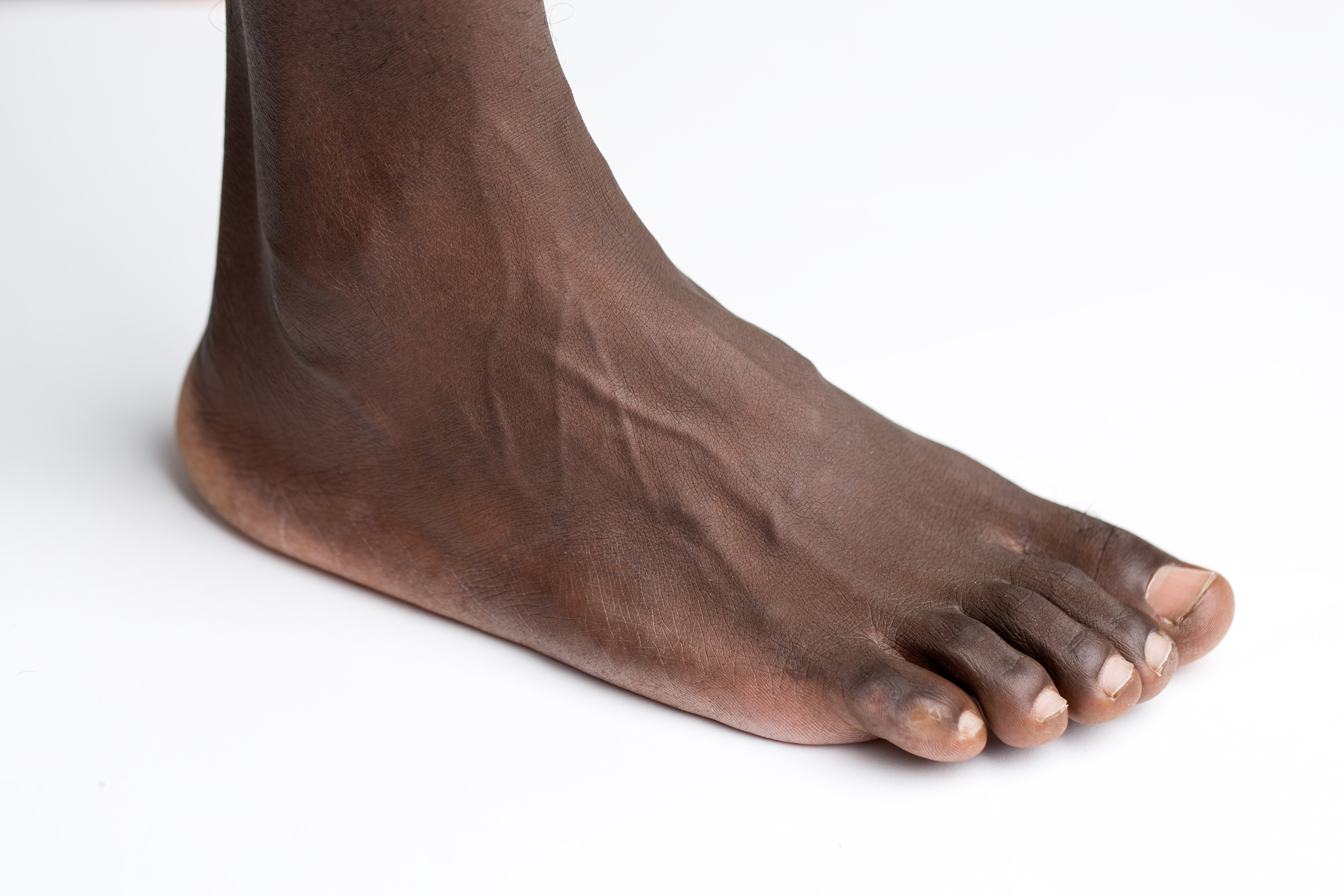
An adult human foot is about 28 cm (11 in) long.

The decimetre (SI symbol: dm) is a unit of length in the metric system equal to 10^{−1} metres (1/10 m = 0.1 m). To help compare different orders of magnitude, this section lists lengths between 10 centimetres and 100 centimetres (10^{−1} metre and 1 metre).

=== Conversions ===
10 centimetres (abbreviated to 10 cm) is equal to:

- 1 decimetre (dm), a term not in common use (1 L = 1 dm^{3}.)
- 100 millimetres
- 3.9 inches
- a side of a square of area 0.01 m^{2}
- the edge of a cube with a volume of 1×10^{−3} m^{3} (1 L)

=== Wavelengths ===
- 10 cm = 1.0 dm – wavelength of the highest UHF radio frequency, 3 GHz
- 12 cm = 1.2 dm – wavelength of the 2.45 GHz ISM radio band
- 21 cm = 2.1 dm – wavelength of the 1.4 GHz hydrogen emission line, a hyperfine transition of the hydrogen atom
- 100 cm = 10 dm – wavelength of the lowest UHF radio frequency, 300 MHz

=== Human-defined scales and structures ===
- 10 cm = 1 dm — length of a kazoo instrument
- 10.16 cm = 1.016 dm – 1 hand used in measuring height of horses (4 inches)
- 12 cm = 1.2 dm – diameter of a compact disc (CD) (120 mm)
- 9–12 cm = 0.9-1.2 dm — average height of a soda can
- 15 cm = 1.5 dm – length of a Bic pen with cap on
- 20 cm = 2 dm — height of a water bottle
- 22 cm = 2.2 dm – diameter of a typical association football (soccer ball)
- 30 cm = 3 dm – typical school-use ruler length (300 mm)
- 30.48 cm = 3.048 dm – 1 foot (measure)
- 60 cm = 6 dm – standard depth (front to back) of a domestic kitchen worktop in Europe (600 mm)
- 60 cm = 6 dm — diameter of the LAGEOS satellite
- 90 cm = 9 dm – average length of a rapier, a fencing sword
- 91 cm = 9.1 dm — length of a shopping cart
- 91.44 cm = 9.144 dm – one yard (measure)

=== Nature ===
- 10 cm = 1 dm – diameter of the human cervix upon entering the second stage of labour
- 11 cm = 1.1 dm – length of an average potato in the U.S.
- 13 cm = 1.3 dm – body length of a Goliath birdeater
- 18.1 cm = 1.81 dm – Maximum overall length of the Hercules beetle, one of the largest beetle species
- 19 cm = 1.9 dm — length of an average male human hand
- 19 cm = 1.9 dm – length of a banana
- 20 cm = 2 dm — diameter of the Syringammina, one of the largest single-celled organisms
- 20 cm = 2 dm - average height of the Venus flytrap
- 26.3 cm = 2.6 dm – length of an average male human foot
- 29.98 cm = 2.998 dm – distance light in vacuum travels in one nanosecond
- 30 cm = 3.0 dm – maximum leg length of a Goliath birdeater
- 31 cm = 3.1 dm – wingspan of largest butterfly species Ornithoptera alexandrae
- 32 cm – length of the Goliath frog, the world's largest frog
- 46 cm = 4.6 dm – length of an average domestic cat
- 46 cm = 4.6 dm – skull length of a Kelenken, a terror bird
- 50 to 65 cm = 5 to 6.5 dm – a coati's tail
- 66 cm = 6.6 dm – length of the longest pine cones (produced by the sugar pine)
- 80 cm = 8 dm - height of a chimpanzee
- 90 cm = 9 dm — length of a capybara, the largest rodent

=== Astronomical ===
- 84 cm = 8.4 dm – approximate diameter of 2008 TS26, a meteoroid

== 1 metre ==
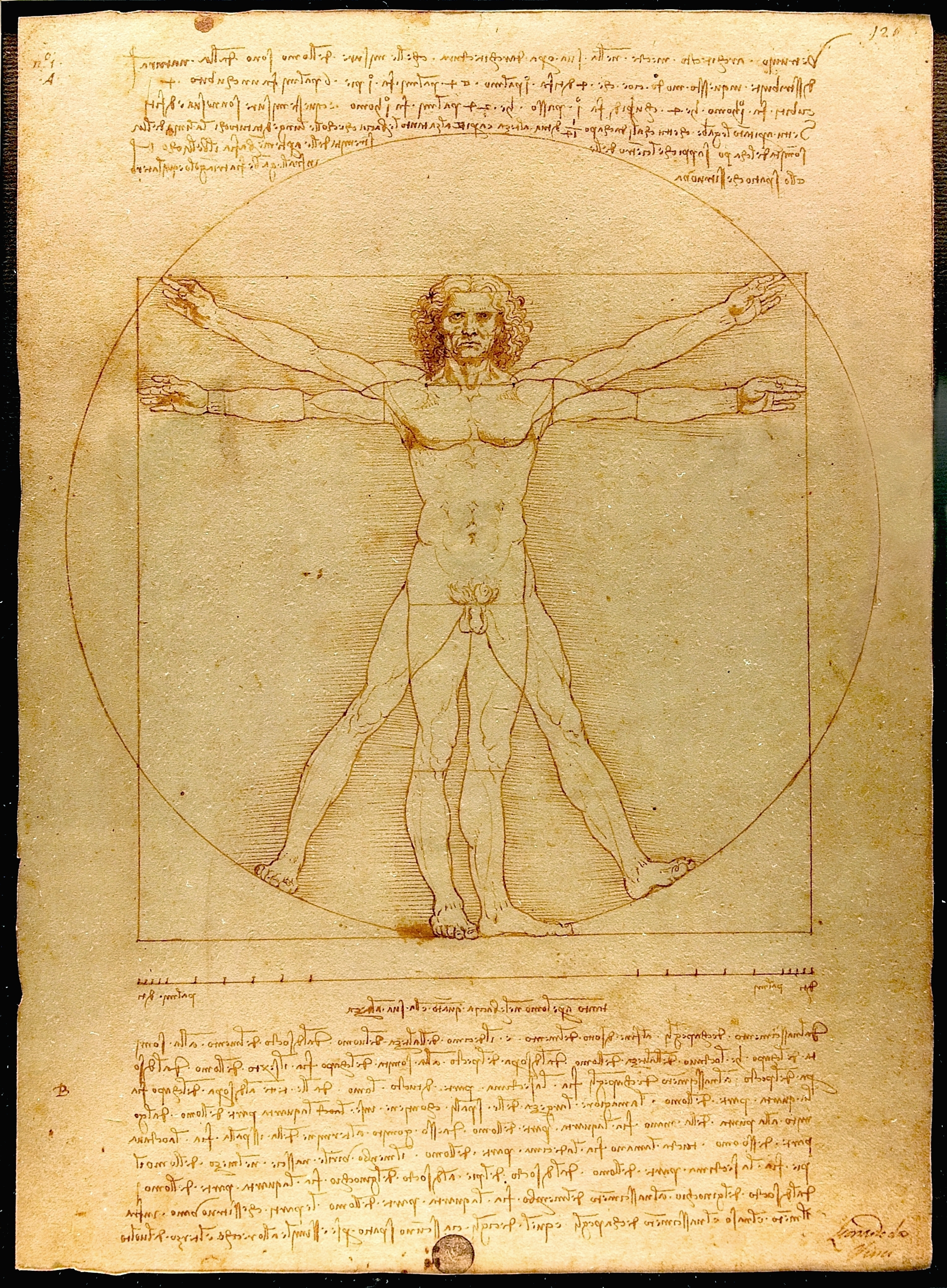
Leonardo da Vinci drew the Vitruvian Man within a square of side 1.83 m (6 ft 0 in) and a circle about 1.2 m (3 ft 11 in) in radius.

To help compare different orders of magnitude, this section lists lengths between one metre and ten metres. Light, in vacuum, travels 1 metre in 1/299,792,458, or 3.3356409519815E-9 of a second.

=== Conversions ===
1 metre is:

- 10 decimetres
- 100 centimetres
- 1,000 millimetres
- 39.37 inches
- 3.28 feet
- 1.1 yards
- side of square with area 1 m^{2}
- edge of cube with surface area 6 m^{2} and volume 1 m^{3}
- radius of circle with area π m^{2}
- radius of sphere with surface area 4π m^{2} and volume 4/3π m^{3}

=== Human-defined scales and structures ===
- 1 m – approximate height to the top part of a doorknob on a door
- 1 m – diameter of a very large beach ball
- 1 m – height of a typical washing machine
- 1.29 m – length of the Cross Island Chapel, the smallest church in the world
- 1.4 m – length of a Peel P50, the world's smallest car
- 1.4 m – length of a pool noodle
- 1.435 m – standard gauge of railway track used by about 60% of railways in the world = 4 ft 8 1/2 in
- 1.5 m – height of the Lasko pedestal fan
- 1.8 m – height of an average refrigerator
- 1.9 m – height of a vending machine
- 2 m – typical height of an average door
- 2.5 m – distance from the floor to the ceiling in an average residential house
- 2.7 m – length of the Starr Bumble Bee II, the smallest plane
- 2.77–3.44 m – wavelength of the broadcast radio FM band 87–108 MHz
- 2.8 m – height of a telephone booth
- 3.05 m – the length of an old Mini
- 6 m – height of an average typical house
- 8 m – length of the Tsar Bomba, the largest bomb ever detonated
- 8.38 m – the length of a London Bus (AEC Routemaster)

=== Sports ===
- 2.44 m – height of an association football goal
- 2.45 m – highest high jump by a human (Javier Sotomayor)
- 3.05 m – (10 feet) height of the basket in basketball
- 8.95 m – longest long jump by a human (Mike Powell)

=== Nature ===
- 1 m – length of Rafflesia arnoldii, the largest flower in the world
- 1 m – height of Homo floresiensis (the "Hobbit")
- 1 m — length of an ocelot, a type of cat
- 1.06 m — length of a goat
- 1.1 m — length of a pig
- 1.15 m – a pizote (mammal)
- 1.5 m – height of an okapi
- 1.5 m — height of an orangutan
- 1.63 m – (5 feet 4 inches, or 64 inches) – height of average US female human as of 2002
- 1.75 m – (5 feet 8 inches) – height of average US male human as of 2002 (source: US Centers for Disease Control and Prevention)
- 1.8 m — height of a gorilla
- 2 m — height of a kangaroo
- 2.1 m – average height of a moose, the largest type of deer
- 2.2 m - height of a gaur, the largest living wild bovid
- 2.4 m – wingspan of a mute swan
- 2.5 m – height of a sunflower
- 2.5 m – average length of a black mamba, the second longest venomous snake and the longest venomous snake in Africa
- 2.5 m - length of a polar bear, the largest living bear
- 2.7 m – length of a leatherback sea turtle, the largest living turtle
- 2.8 m - length of a tiger, largest living feline
- 2.72 m – (8 feet 11 inches) – tallest-known human (Robert Wadlow)
- 3 m – length of a giant Gippsland earthworm
- 3 m – length of an Komodo dragon, the largest living lizard
- 3.3 m – wingspan of an Andean condor
- 3.5 m – typical wingspan of a wandering albatross, the bird with the longest wingspan today
- 3.63 m – the record wingspan for living birds (a wandering albatross individual)
- 3.7 m – leg span of a Japanese spider crab
- 3.7 m – length of a southern elephant seal, the largest living pinniped
- 4 m – average length of an king cobra, the longest venomous snake
- 4 m – length of a hippopotamus
- 4.4 m – length of an Asian elephant
- 5 m - average length of a Nile crocodile, the second largest living reptile
- 5 m – length of an African bush elephant
- 5.2 m – height of a giraffe
- 5.21 m – length of a green anaconda, the largest living snake
- 5.5 m – height of a Baluchitherium, the largest land mammal ever lived
- 6 m - average length of a saltwater crocodile, the largest living reptile
- 6.5 m – length of an reticulated python, the longest living snake
- 6.5 m – wingspan of Argentavis, the largest flying bird known
- 6.7 m – length of a Microchaetus rappi
- 7.4 m – wingspan of Pelagornis, the bird with longest wingspan ever.
- 7.5 m – approximate length of the human gastrointestinal tract

=== Astronomical ===
- 3 to 6 m – approximate diameter of 2003 SQ222, a meteoroid
- 4.1 m – diameter of 2008 TC3, a small asteroid that flew into the Earth's atmosphere on 7 October 2008

== 1 decametre ==
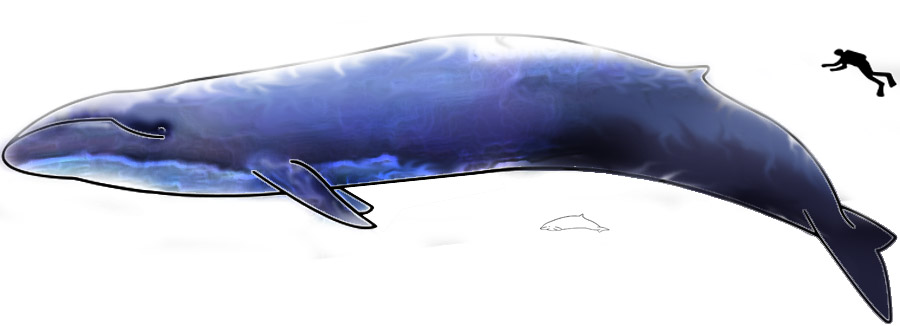
A blue whale has been measured as 33 m (108 ft) long; this drawing compares its length to that of a human diver and a dolphin.

The decametre (SI symbol: dam) is a unit of length in the metric system equal to 10 metres (10^{1} m). To help compare different orders of magnitude, this section lists lengths between 10 and 100 metres.

=== Conversions ===
10 metres (very rarely termed a decametre which is abbreviated as dam) is equal to:

- 10 metres
- 100 decimetres
- 1,000 centimetres
- 10,000 millimetres
- 10,000,000 micrometres (or rarely 10,000,000 microns)
- 32.8 feet
- 11 yards
- side of a square with area 100 m²

=== Human-defined scales and structures ===
- 10 metres – wavelength of the highest shortwave radio frequency, 30 MHz
- 10.2 metres – length of the Panzer VIII Maus, the world's largest tank
- 12 metres – height of the Newby-McMahon Building, the world's littlest skyscraper
- 12 metres — length of a school bus and city bus
- 16 metres — length of a semi-truck
- 23 metres – height of Luxor Obelisk, located in the Place de la Concorde, Paris, France
- 25 metres – wavelength of the broadcast radio shortwave band at 12 MHz
- 29 metres – height of the Savudrija Lighthouse
- 30 metres – height of Christ the Redeemer
- 31 metres – wavelength of the broadcast radio shortwave band at 9.7 MHz
- 32 metres – length of one arcsecond of latitude on the surface of the Earth
- 33.3 metres – height of the De Noord, the tallest windmill in the world
- 34 metres – height of the Split Point Lighthouse in Aireys Inlet, Victoria, Australia
- 40 metres – rotorspan of the Mil Mi-26, the largest helicopter
- 40 metres – average depth beneath the seabed of the Channel tunnel
- 49 metres – wavelength of the broadcast radio shortwave band at 6.1 MHz
- 50 metres – length of a road train
- 50 metres – height of the Arc de Triomphe
- 55 metres – height of the Leaning Tower of Pisa
- 18–55 metres — height of a Transmission tower
- 56 metres — height of the Space Shuttle
- 62 metres – wingspan of Concorde
- 62.5 metres – height of Pyramid of Djoser
- 64 metres – wingspan of a Boeing 747-400
- 69 metres – wingspan of an Antonov An-124 Ruslan
- 70 metres – length of the Bayeux Tapestry
- 70 metres – width of a typical association football field
- 73 metres – wingspan of a Airbus A380
- 73 metres – height of the Taj Mahal
- 77 metres – wingspan of a Boeing 747-8
- 88.4 metres – wingspan of an Antonov An-225 Mriya transport aircraft
- 93 metres – height of the Statue of Liberty (Liberty Enlightening the World)
- 96 metres – height of Big Ben
- 98 metres – height of the Space Launch System rocket that will[ take humans back to the Moon.
- 98 metres – height of Blue Origin's partially reusable New Glenn rocket.
- 100 metres – wavelength of the lowest shortwave radio frequency, 3 MHz

=== Sports ===
Comparison of playing surfaces of various sports, excluding run-offs

- 11 metres – approximate width of a doubles tennis court
- 15 metres – width of a standard FIBA basketball court
- 15.24 metres – width of an NBA basketball court (50 feet)
- 18.44 metres – distance between the front of the pitcher's rubber and the rear point of home plate on a baseball field (60 feet, 6 inches)
- 20 metres – length of cricket pitch (22 yards)
- 27.43 metres – distance between bases on a baseball field (90 feet)
- 28 metres – length of a standard FIBA basketball court
- 28.65 metres – length of an NBA basketball court (94 feet)
- 49 metres – width of an American football field (53 1/3 yards)
- 59.436 metres – width of a Canadian football field (65 yards)
- 70 metres – typical width of an association football field
- 91 metres – length of an American football field (100 yards, measured between the goal lines)

=== Nature ===
- 10 metres – average length of human digestive tract
- 12 metres – height of a standard saguaro cactus
- 12 metres – moderate length of a whale shark, largest living fish
- 12 metres – wingspan of a Quetzalcoatlus, a pterosaur
- 12 metres – length of a Sarcosuchus, the largest crocodile ever
- 12.8 metres – length of a Titanoboa, the largest snake to have ever lived
- 13 metres – approximate length of a giant squid and colossal squid, the largest living invertebrates
- 13 metres – length of a Tyrannosaurus, the most popular dinosaur
- 14 metres – typical length of a Whale shark, the largest fish today
- 15 metres – approximate distance the tropical circles of latitude are moving towards the equator and the polar circles are moving towards the poles each year due to a natural, gradual decrease in the Earth's axial tilt
- 16 metres – length of a sperm whale, the largest toothed whale
- 17 metres – length of an average-sized Megalodon, widely considered to be the largest shark to ever roam the waters
- 18 metres – height of a Sauroposeidon, the tallest-known dinosaur
- 18 metres – maximum length of Spinosaurus, the largest land-living carnivore ever existed
- 20 metres – length of a Leedsichthys, the largest-known fish to have lived
- 21 metres – height of High Force waterfall in England
- 30.5 metres – length of the lion's mane jellyfish, the largest jellyfish in the world
- 33 metres – length of a blue whale, the largest animal on earth, living or extinct, in terms of mass
- 35 metres – length of an Argentinosaurus, the second-longest dinosaur
- 39 metres – length of a Supersaurus, the longest-known dinosaur and longest vertebrate
- 40 metres – supposed length of Maraapunisaurus
- 44 metres – potential length of Bruhathkayosaurus in studies of 2023
- 52 metres – height of Niagara Falls
- 55 metres – length of a bootlace worm, the longest-known animal
- 58 metres – possible length of an Amphicoelias
- 66 metres – highest possible sea level rise due to a complete melting of all ice on Earth
- 83 metres – height of a western hemlock
- 84 metres – height of General Sherman, the largest tree by volume in the world

=== Astronomical ===
- 30.8568 metres – 1 femtoparsec
- 11 metres – diameter of 1998 KY26, a rapidly spinning asteroid

== 1 hectometre ==
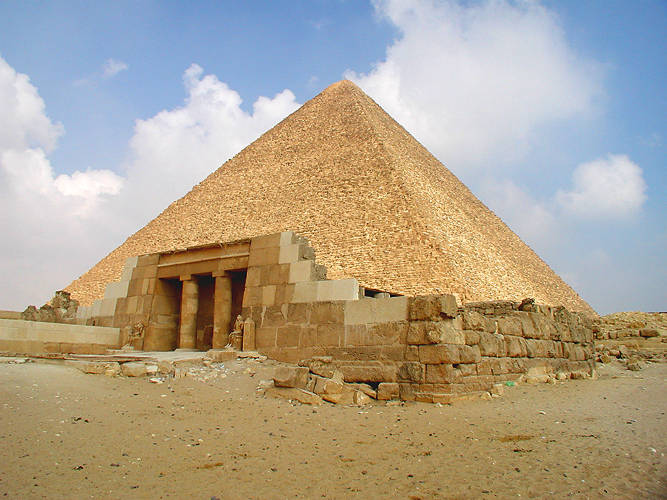
The Great Pyramid of Giza is 138.8 m (455 ft) high.

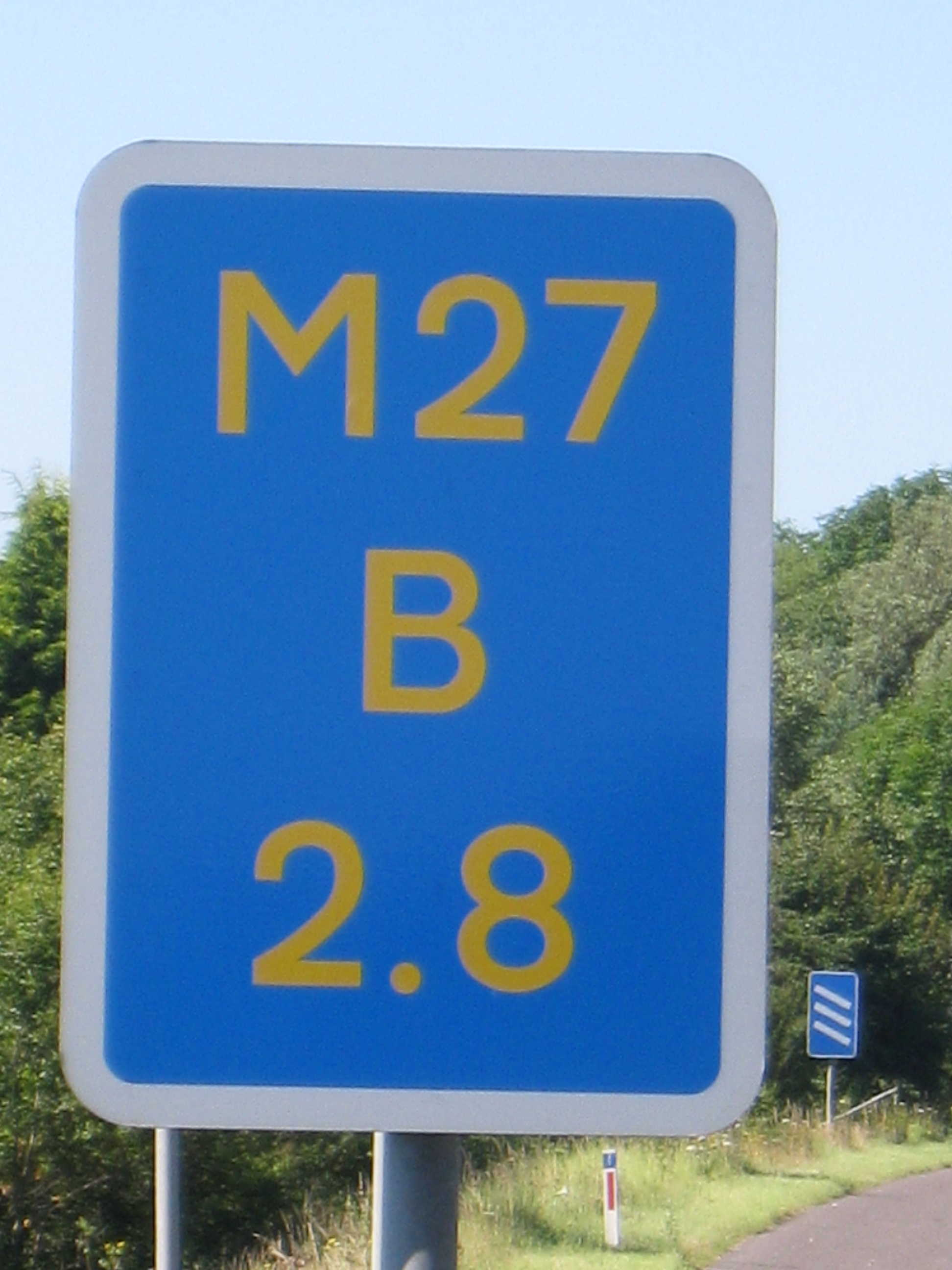
British driver location sign and location marker post on the M27 in Hampshire. The location marker posts are installed at 100-metre intervals.

The hectometre (SI symbol: hm) is a unit of length in the metric system equal to 100 metres (10^{2} m). To compare different orders of magnitude this section lists lengths between 100 metres and 1,000 metres (1 kilometre).

=== Conversions ===
100 metres (sometimes termed a hectometre) is equal to:

- 327.9 feet
- one side of a 1 hectare square
- a fifth of a modern li, a Chinese unit of measurement
- the approximate distance travelled by light in 300 nanoseconds

=== Human-defined scales and structures ===
- 100 metres – wavelength of the highest medium wave radio frequency, 3 MHz
- 100 metres – spacing of location marker posts on British motorways
- 103 metres – length of the Spearhead-class expeditionary fast transport
- 109 metres – width of the International Space Station
- 110 metres – height of the Saturn V
- 122 metres – height of the Starship v1, the tallest rocket currently under development by SpaceX
- 138.8 metres – height of the Great Pyramid of Giza (Pyramid of Cheops)
- 139 metres – height of the world's former tallest roller coaster, Kingda Ka
- 140 metres – height of SpaceX's Starship v3.
- 157 metres – height of the Cologne Cathedral
- 162 metres – height of the Ulm Minster, the tallest church building in the world
- 162 metres – height of the Falcon's Flight, the tallest roller coaster as of October 2026.
- 165 metres – height of the Dushanbe Flagpole, the tallest flagpole from May 2011 to September 2014
- 169 metres – height of the Washington Monument
- 171 metres – height of the Jeddah Flagpole, the tallest flagpole from September 2014 to December 2021
- 182 metres – height of the Statue of Unity, the world's tallest statue
- 187 metres – shortest wavelength of the broadcast radio AM band, 1600 kHz
- 192 metres – height of the Gateway Arch
- 200 metres — length of a high speed train (AVE)
- 202 metres – height of the Cairo Flagpole, the tallest flagpole as of October 2026
- 202 metres – length of the Széchenyi Chain Bridge connecting Buda and Pest
- 220 metres – height of the Hoover Dam
- 225 metres — length of the Bagger 293
- 245 metres – length of the LZ 129 Hindenburg
- 270 metres – length of the Titanic
- 300 metres — length of an Aircraft carrier
- 318 metres – height of The New York Times Building
- 318.9 metres – height of the Chrysler Building
- 328 metres – height of Auckland's Sky Tower, the tallest free-standing structure in the Southern Hemisphere (1996–2022)
- 330 metres – height of the Eiffel Tower (including antenna)
- 336 metres – height of the Millau Viaduct, formerly the tallest bridge.
- 364.75 metres – length of the Icon of the Seas
- 390 metres – height of the Empire State Building
- 400 to 800 metres – approximate heights of the world's tallest skyscrapers from 1931 to 2010
- 458 metres – length of the Knock Nevis, the world's largest supertanker
- 502 metres — length of the Overburden Conveyor Bridge F60
- 553.33 metres – height of the CN Tower, the tallest structure in North America
- 555 metres – longest wavelength of the broadcast radio AM band, 540 kHz
- 625 metres – height of the tallest bridge in the world as of October 2026, the Huajiang Canyon Bridge
- 630 metres – height of the KVLY-TV mast, one of the tallest structures in the world
- 640 metres – height of the Petronius oil platform measured from the sea floor.
- 646 metres – height of the Warsaw radio mast, the world's tallest structure until its collapse in 1991
- 679 metres – height of Merdeka 118, the second tallest structure in Kuala Lumpur, Malaysia
- 828 metres – height of Burj Khalifa, world's tallest structure since 17 January 2009
- 1,000 metres – wavelength of the lowest mediumwave radio frequency, 300 kHz

=== Sports ===
- 100 metres – the distance a very fast human can run in about 10 seconds
- 100.584 metres – length of a Canadian football field between the goal lines (110 yards)
- 91.5 metres – 137 metres – length of a soccer field
- 105 metres – length of football pitch (UEFA stadium categories 3 and 4)
- 105 metres – length of a typical football field
- 109.73 metres – total length of an American football field (120 yards, including the end zones)
- 110 to 150 metres – the width of an Australian football field
- 135 to 185 metres – the length of an Australian football field
- 137.16 metres – total length of a Canadian football field, including the end zones (150 yards)

=== Nature ===
- 115.5 metres – height of the world's tallest tree in 2007, the Hyperion sequoia
- 310 metres – maximum depth of Lake Geneva
- 340 metres – distance sound travels in air at sea level in one second; see Speed of sound
- 947 metres – height of the Tugela Falls, the highest waterfall in Africa
- 979 metres – height of the Angel Falls in Venezuela, the world's highest free-falling waterfall

=== Astronomical ===
- 270 metres – length of 99942 Apophis
- 535 metres – length of 25143 Itokawa, a small asteroid visited by a spacecraft

== 1 kilometre ==
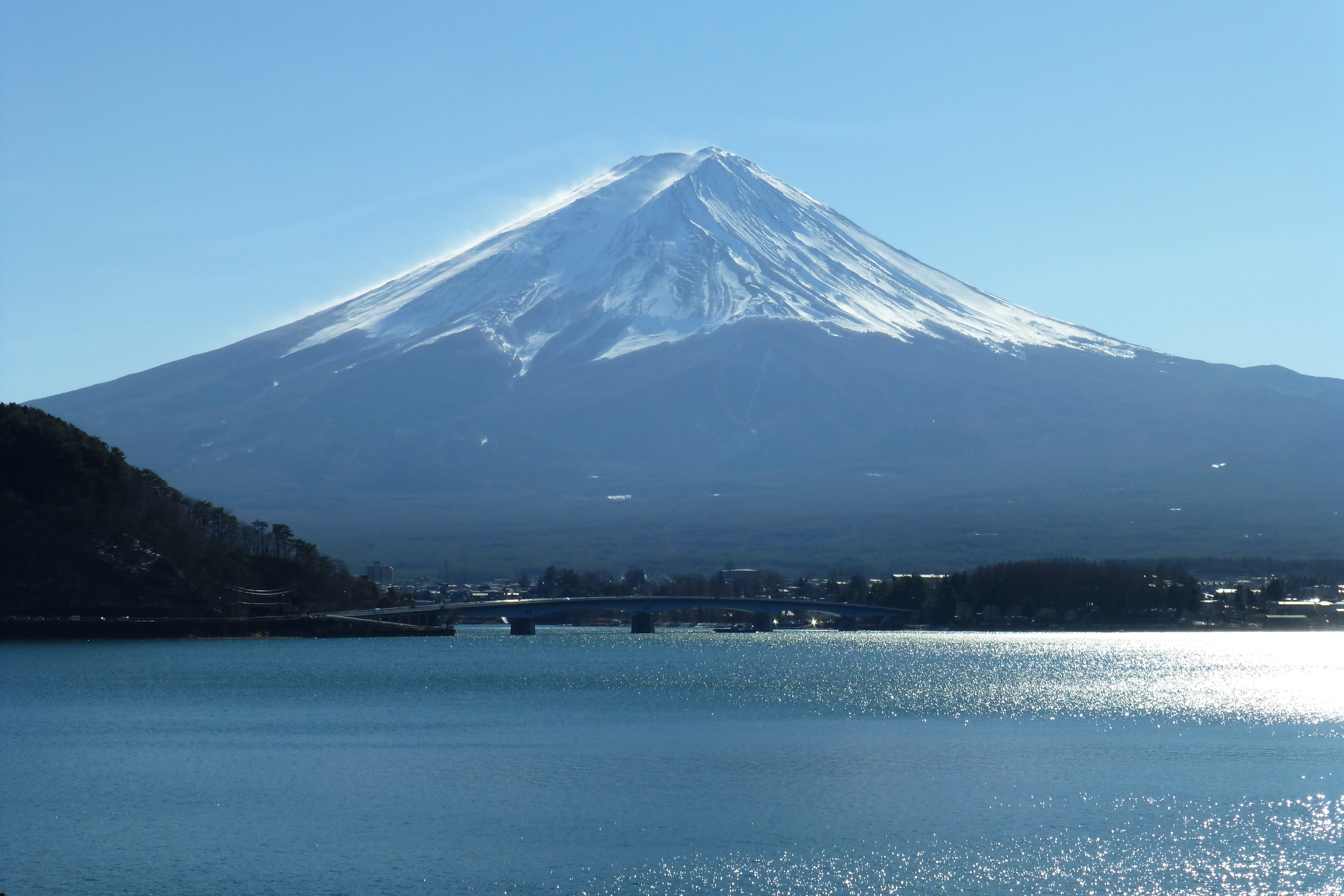
Mount Fuji is 3.776 kilometres (2.346 mi) high.

The kilometre (SI symbol: km) is a unit of length in the metric system equal to 1000 metres (10^{3} m). To help compare different orders of magnitude, this section lists lengths between 1 kilometre and 10 kilometres (10^{3} and 10^{4} metres).

=== Conversions ===
1 kilometre (unit symbol km) is equal to:

- 1,000 metres
- 0.621371 miles
- 1,093.61 yards
- 3,280.84 feet
- 39,370.1 inches
- 100,000 centimetres
- 1,000,000 millimetres
- Side of a square of area 1 km^{2}
- Radius of a circle of area π km^{2}

=== Human-defined scales and structures ===
- 1 km – wavelength of the highest long wave radio frequency, 300 kHz
- 1.008 km – proposed height of the Jeddah Tower, a megatall skyscraper under construction in Saudi Arabia
- 1.280 km – span of the Golden Gate Bridge (distance between towers)
- 1.609 km – 1 statute mile
- 1.852 km – 1 nautical mile, equal to 1 arcminute of latitude at the surface of the Earth
- 1.991 km – span of the Akashi Kaikyō Bridge
- 2.309 km – axial length of the Three Gorges Dam, the largest dam in the world located in China
- 3.991 km – length of the Akashi Kaikyō Bridge, longest suspension bridge in the world as of December 2008
- 4 km – width of Central Park
- 5.072 km – elevation of Tanggula Mountain Pass, below highest peak in the Tanggula Mountains, highest railway pass in the world as of August 2005
- 5.8 km – elevation of Cerro Aucanquilcha, highest road in the world, located in Chile
- 98 airports have paved runways from 4 km to 5.5 km in length.
- 8 km – length of Palm Jebel Ali, an artificial island built off the coast of Dubai
- 9.8 km – length of The World, an artificial archipelago that is also built off the coast of Dubai, whose islands resemble a world map

=== Nature ===
- 1.5 km – distance sound travels in water in one second

=== Geographical ===
- 1.637 km – deepest dive of Lake Baikal in Russia, the world's largest freshwater lake
- 2.228 km – height of Mount Kosciuszko, highest point on mainland Australia
- Most of Manhattan is from 3 to 4 km wide.
- 3.776 km – height of Mount Fuji, highest peak in Japan
- 4.478 km – height of Matterhorn
- 4.509 km – height of Mount Wilhelm, highest peak in Papua New Guinea
- 4.810 km – height of Mont Blanc, highest peak in the Alps
- 4.884 km – height of Carstensz Pyramid, highest peak in Oceania
- 4.892 km – height of Mount Vinson, highest peak in Antarctica
- 5.610 km – height of Mount Damavand, highest peak in Iran
- 5.642 km – height of Mount Elbrus, highest peak in Europe
- 5.895 km – height of Mount Kilimanjaro, highest peak in Africa
- 6.081 km – height of Mount Logan, highest peak in Canada
- 6.190 km – height of Denali, highest peak in North America
- 6.959 km – height of Aconcagua, highest peak in South America
- 7.5 km – depth of Cayman Trench, deepest point in the Caribbean Sea
- 8.611 km – height of K2, second highest peak on Earth
- 8.848 km – height of Mount Everest, highest peak on Earth, on the border between Nepal and China

=== Astronomical ===
- 1 km – diameter of 1620 Geographos
- 1 km – very approximate size of the smallest-known moons of Jupiter
- 1.4 km – diameter of Dactyl, the first confirmed asteroid moon
- 4.8 km – diameter of 5535 Annefrank, an inner belt asteroid
- 5 km – diameter of 3753 Cruithne
- 5 km – length of PSR B1257+12
- 8 km – diameter of Themisto, one of Jupiter's moons
- 8 km – diameter of the Vela Pulsar
- 8.6 km – diameter of Callirrhoe, also known as Jupiter XVII
- 9.737 km – length of PSR B1919+21

== 10 kilometres (1 myriametre) ==
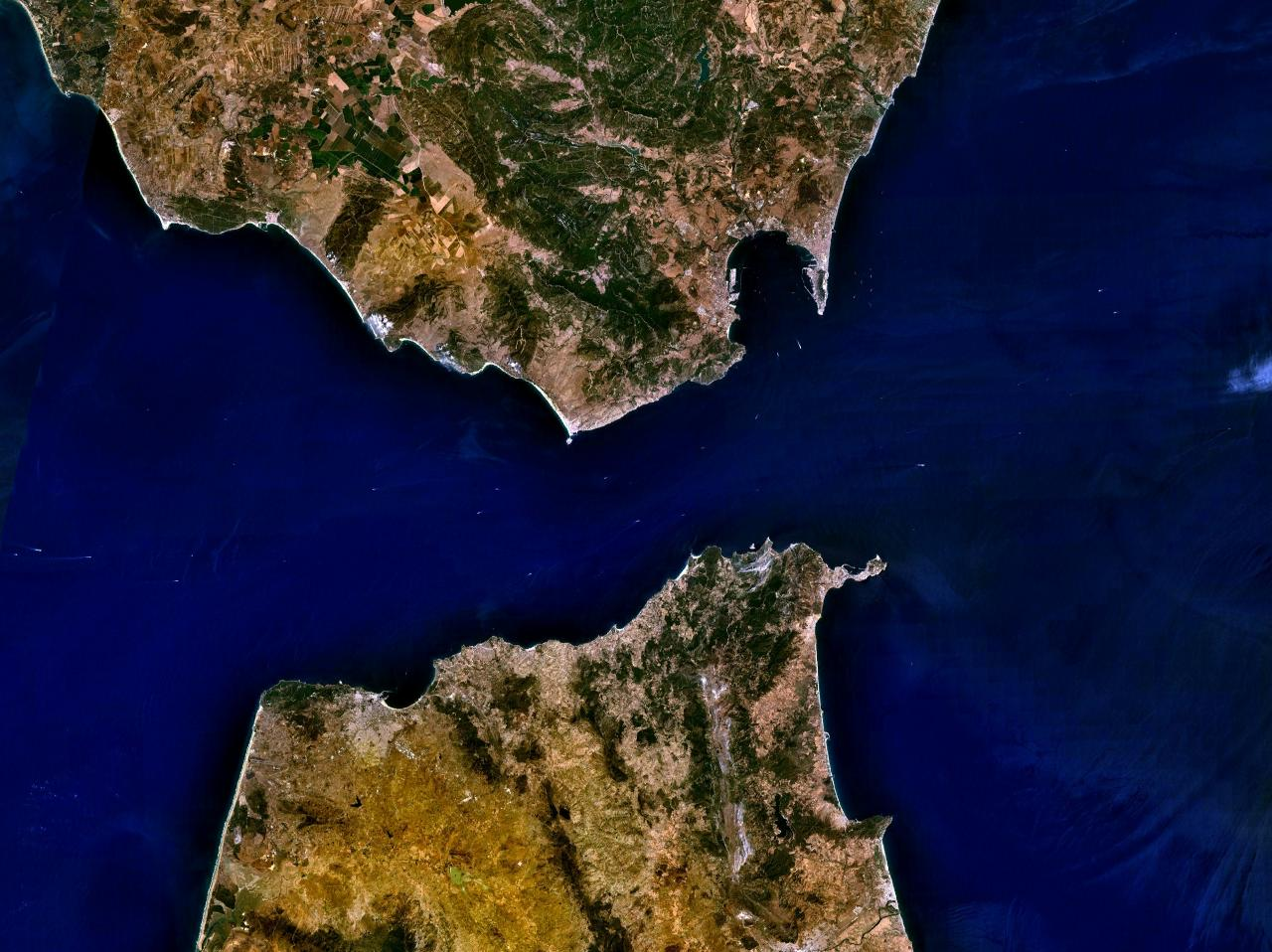
The Strait of Gibraltar is 13 km (8.1 mi) wide.

To help compare different orders of magnitude, this section lists lengths between 10 and 100 kilometres (10^{4} to 10^{5} metres). The myriametre (sometimes also spelled myriometre; 10,000 metres) is a deprecated unit name; the decimal metric prefix myria- (sometimes also written as myrio-) is obsolete and was not included among the prefixes when the International System of Units was introduced in 1960.

=== Conversions ===
10 kilometres is equal to:

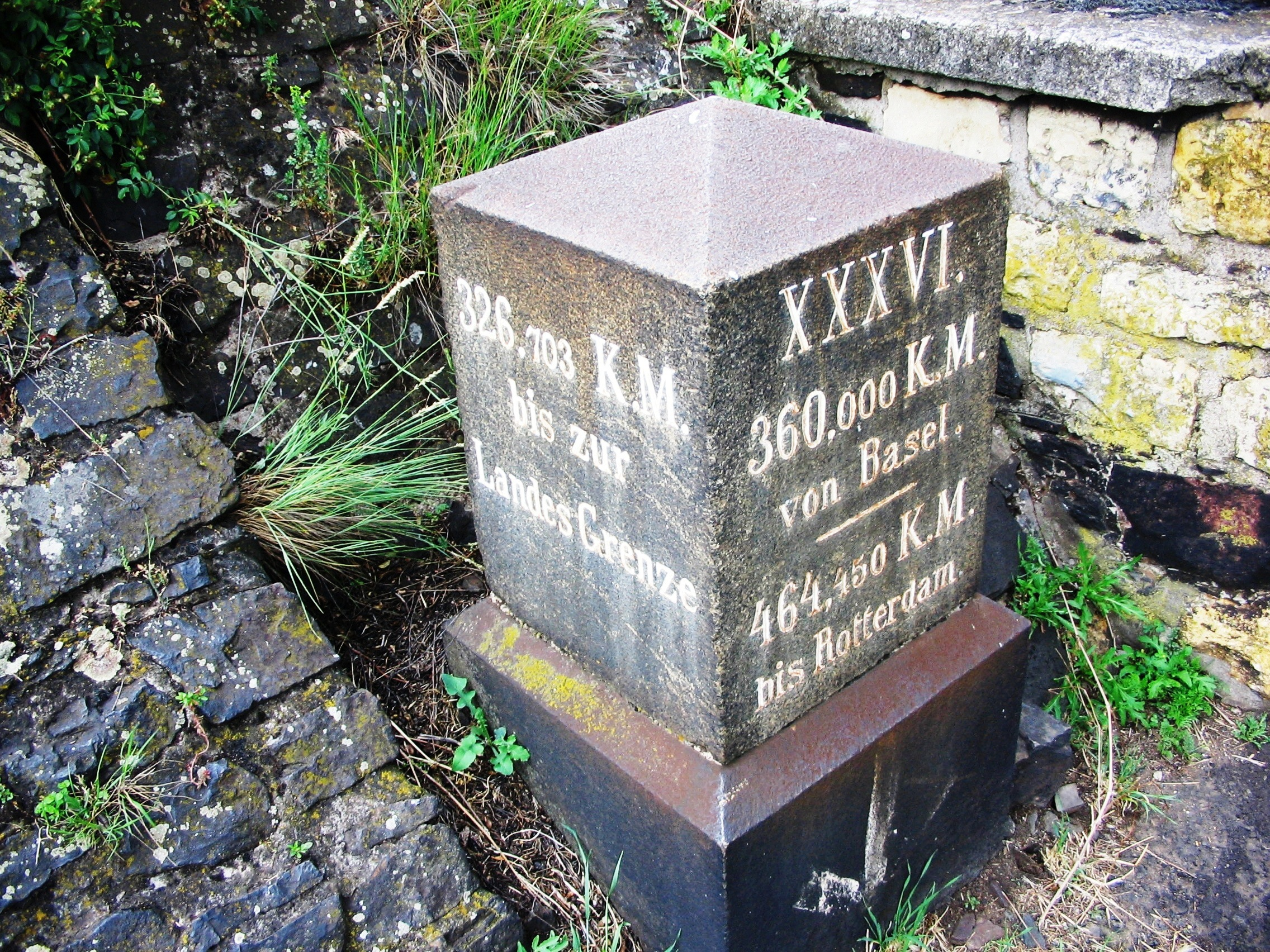
Distance marker on the Rhine: 36 (XXXVI) myriametres from Basel. The stated distance is 360 km (220 mi); the comma is the decimal separator in Germany.

- 10,000 metres
- About 6.2 miles
- 1 mil (the Scandinavian mile), now standardized as 10 km:
  - 1 mil, the unit of measure commonly used in Norway and Sweden used to be 11,295 m in Norway and 10,688 m in Sweden.
- farsang, unit of measure commonly used in Iran and Turkey

=== Sports ===
- 42.195 km – length of the marathon

=== Human-defined scales and structures ===
- 18 km – cruising altitude of Concorde
- 27 km – circumference of the Large Hadron Collider, as of May 2010 the largest and highest energy particle accelerator
- 34.668 km – highest manned balloon flight (Malcolm D. Ross and Victor E. Prather on 4 May 1961)
- 38.422 km – length of the Second Lake Pontchartrain Causeway in Louisiana, U.S.
- 39 km – undersea portion of the Channel tunnel
- 53.9 km – length of the Seikan Tunnel, as of October 2009, the longest rail tunnel in the world
- 77 km – rough total length of the Panama Canal

=== Geographical ===
- 10 km – height of Mauna Kea in Hawaii, measured from its base on the ocean floor
- 11 km – deepest-known point of the ocean, Challenger Deep in the Mariana Trench
- 11 km – average height of the troposphere
- 14 km – width of the Strait of Gibraltar
- 21 km – length of Manhattan
- 22 km – narrowest width of the Cook Strait between New Zealand's main islands
- 23 km – depth of the largest earthquake ever recorded in the United Kingdom, in 1931 at the Dogger Bank of the North Sea
- 34 km – narrowest width of the English Channel at the Strait of Dover
- 50 km – approximate height of the stratosphere
- 90 km – width of the Bering Strait

=== Astronomical ===
- 10 km – diameter of the most massive neutron stars (3–5 solar masses)
- 13 km – mean diameter of Deimos, the smaller moon of Mars
- 20 km – diameter of the least massive neutron stars (1.44 solar masses)
- 20 km – diameter of Leda, one of Jupiter's moons
- 20 km – diameter of Pan, one of Saturn's moons
- 20 km – diameter of the Crab Pulsar.
- 22 km – diameter of Phobos, the larger moon of Mars
- 27 km – height of Olympus Mons above the Mars reference level, the highest-known mountain of the Solar System
- 30.8568 km – 1 picoparsec
- 43 km – diameter difference of Earth's equatorial bulge
- 66 km – diameter of Naiad, the innermost of Neptune's moons

== 100 kilometres ==
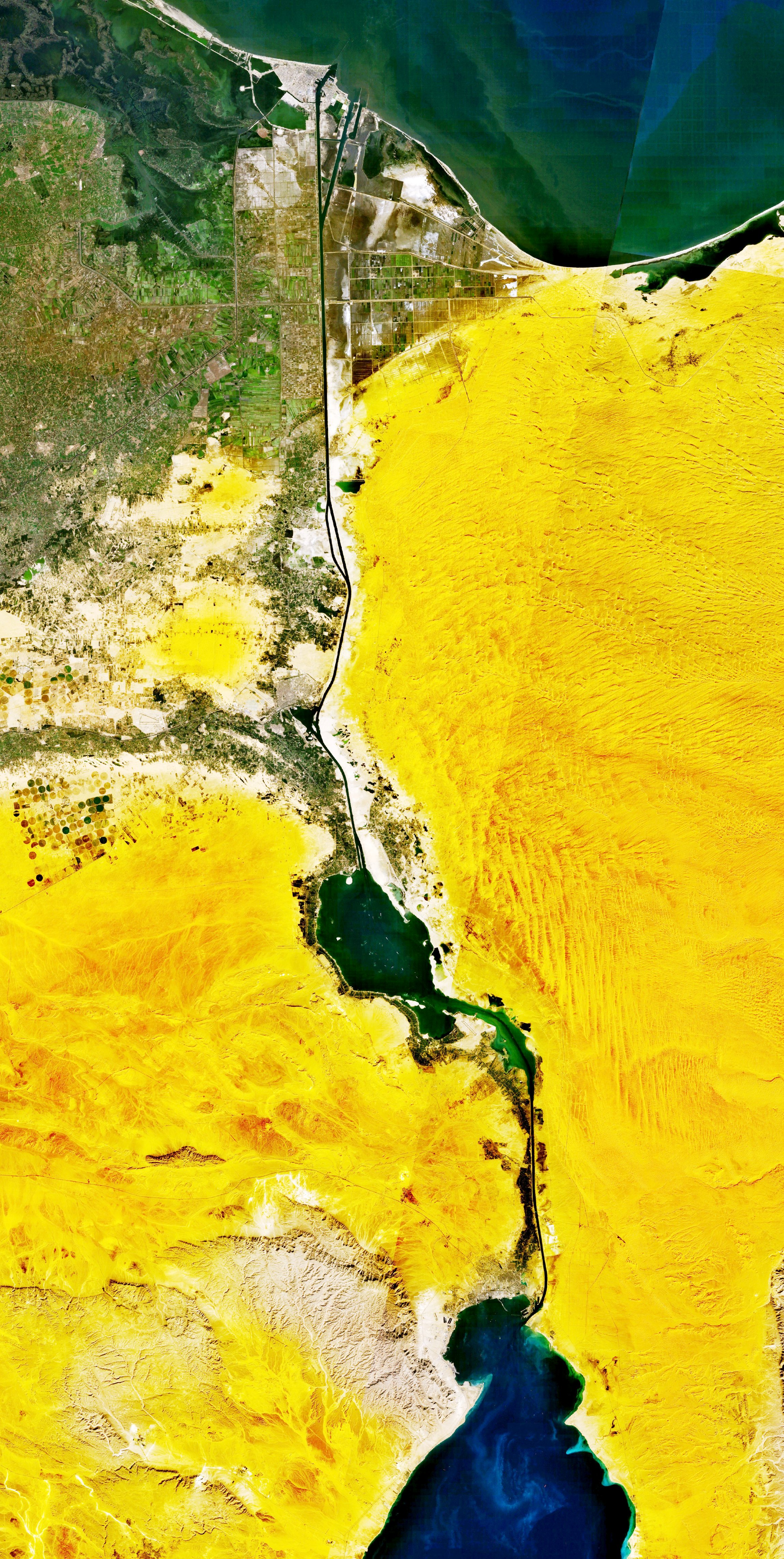
The Suez Canal is 163 km (101 mi) long.

A length of 100 kilometres (about 62 miles), as a rough amount, is relatively common in measurements on Earth and for some astronomical objects. It is the altitude at which the FAI defines spaceflight to begin.

To help compare orders of magnitude, this section lists lengths between 100 and 1,000 kilometres (10^{5} and 10^{6} metres).

=== Conversions ===
A distance of 100 kilometres is approximately 62 miles (or 62.137 miles exactly).

=== Human-defined scales and structures ===
- 100 km – the Kármán line: the internationally recognized boundary of outer space
- 105 km – distance from Giridih to Bokaro
- 109 km – length of High Speed 1 between London and the Channel Tunnel
- 130 km – range of a Scud-A missile
- 163 km – length of the Suez Canal
- 164 km – length of the Danyang–Kunshan Grand Bridge
- 213 km – length of Paris Metro
- 217 km – length of the Grand Union Canal
- 223 km – length of the Madrid Metro
- 300 km – range of a Scud-B missile
- 386 km – average altitude of the International Space Station
- 408 km – length of the London Underground (active track)
- 460 km – distance from London to Paris
- 470 km – distance from Dublin to London as the crow flies
- 600 km – range of a Scud-C missile
- 600 km – height above ground of the Hubble Space Telescope
- 804.67 km – distance of the Indy 500 automobile race (500 miles)

=== Geographical ===
- 42 km – width of Singapore
- 75 km – width of Rhode Island
- 111 km – distance covered by one degree of latitude on Earth's surface
- 120 km – width of Brunei
- 180 km – distance between Mumbai and Nashik
- 200 km – width of Qatar
- 203 km – length of Sognefjorden, the third-largest fjord in the world
- 220 km – distance between Pune and Nashik
- 240 km – width of Rwanda
- 240 km – widest width of the English Channel
- 400 km – width of West Virginia
- 430 km – length of the Pyrenees
- 450 km – length of the Grand Canyon
- 500 km – widest width of Sweden from east to west
- 501 km – width of Uganda
- 550 km – distance from San Francisco to Los Angeles as the crow flies
- 560 km – distance of Bordeaux–Paris, formerly the longest one-day professional cycling race
- 590 km – length of land boundary between Finland and Sweden
- 724 km – length of the Om River
- 800 km – width of Germany
- 871 km – distance from Sydney to Melbourne (along the Hume Highway)
- 897 km – length of the River Douro
- 900 km – distance from Berlin to Stockholm
- 956 km – distance from Washington, D.C., to Chicago, Illinois, as the crow flies
- 970 km – distance from Land's End to John o' Groats as the crow flies

=== Astronomical ===
- 100 km – the altitude at which the FAI defines spaceflight to begin
- 167 km – diameter of Amalthea, one of Jupiter's inner moons
- 200 km – width of Valles Marineris
- 220 km – diameter of Phoebe, the largest of Saturn's outer moons
- 300 km – the approximate distance travelled by light in one millisecond
- 340 km – diameter of Nereid, the third-largest moon of Neptune which has a highly elliptical orbit
- 350 km – lower bound of Low Earth orbit
- 420 km – diameter of Proteus, the second-largest moon of Neptune
- 468 km – diameter of the asteroid 4 Vesta
- 472 km – diameter of Miranda, one of Uranus's major moons
- 974.6 km – greatest diameter of 1 Ceres, the largest Solar System asteroid

== 1 megametre ==
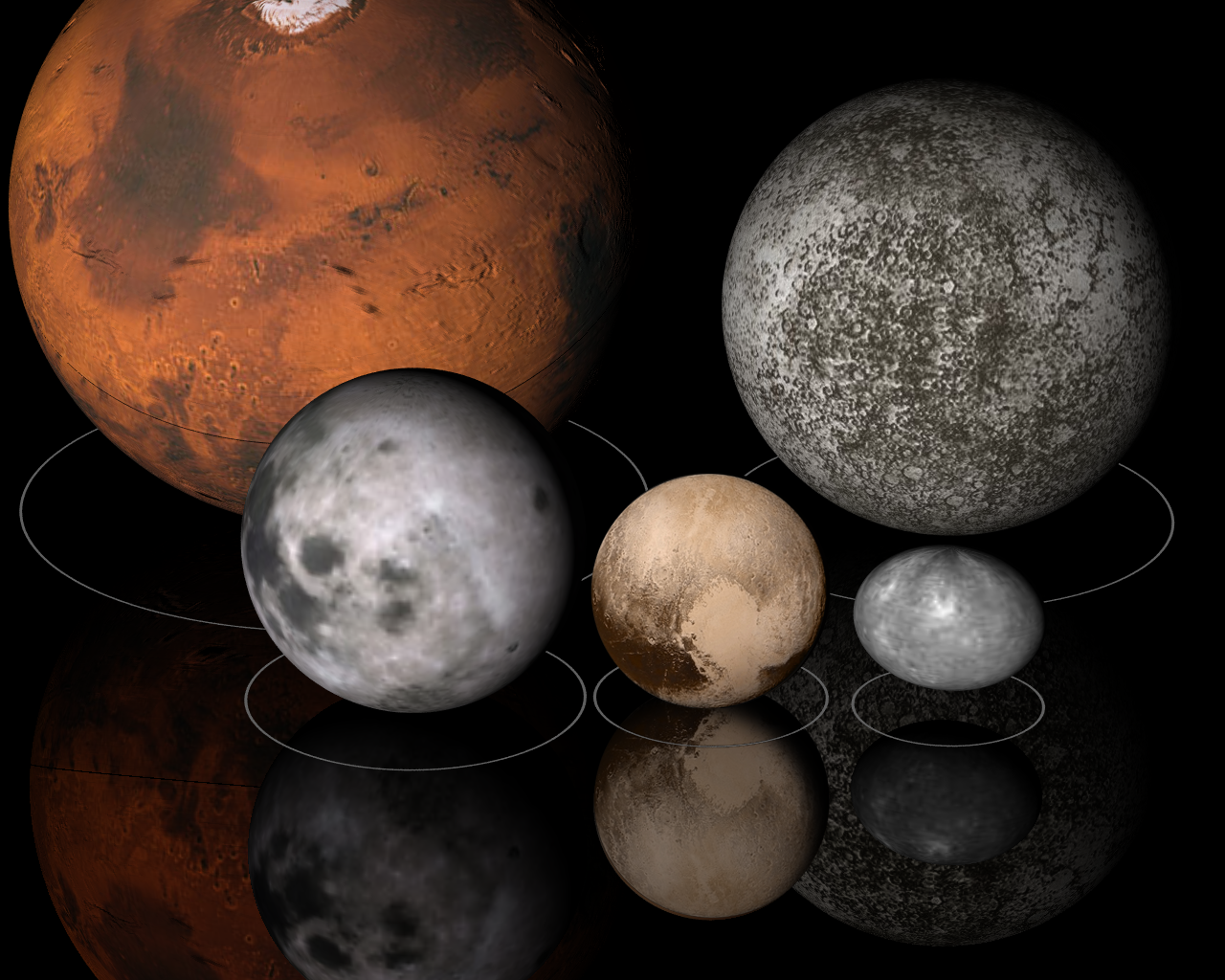
Small planets, the Moon and dwarf planets in the Solar System have diameters from one to ten million metres. Top row: Mars (left), Mercury (right); bottom row: Moon (left), Pluto (center), and Haumea (right), to scale.

The megametre (SI symbol: Mm) is a unit of length in the metric system equal to 1000000 metres (10^{6} m). To help compare different orders of magnitude, this section lists lengths starting at 10^{6} m (1 Mm or 1,000 km).

=== Conversions ===
1 megametre is equal to:

- 1000 km
- 10^{6} m (one million metres)
- approximately 621.37 miles

=== Human-defined scales and structures ===
- 2.100 Mm – length of proposed Iran-Pakistan-India gas pipe
- 2.100 Mm – distance from Casablanca to Rome
- 2.288 Mm – length of the official Alaska Highway when it was built in the 1940s
- 2.688 Mm – distance from Point Nemo, the farthest place anyone could get from any land, to the closest point of land, Easter Island
- 3.069 Mm – length of Interstate 95 (from Houlton, Maine, to Miami, Florida)
- 3.38 Mm – length of the Pan-Philippine Highway (includes segments from Laoag, Ilocos Norte to Matnog, Sorsogon; Allen, Northern Samar to Liloan, Southern Leyte; Surigao City, Surigao del Norte to Zamboanga City; as well as spurs from Palo, Leyte to Ormoc, Leyte and Davao City to Cagayan de Oro)
- 3.846 Mm – length of U.S. Route 1 (from Fort Kent, Maine, to Key West, Florida)
- 5.000 Mm – width of the United States
- 5.007 Mm – estimated length of Interstate 90 (Seattle, Washington, to Boston, Massachusetts)
- 5.614 Mm – length of the Australian Dingo Fence
- 6.371 Mm – global-average Earth radius
- 6.4 Mm – length of the Great Wall of China
- 7.821 Mm – length of the Trans-Canada Highway, the world's longest national highway (from Victoria, British Columbia, to St. John's, Newfoundland)
- 8.836 Mm – road distance between Prudhoe Bay, Alaska, and Key West, Florida, the endpoints of the U.S. road network
- 8.852 Mm – aggregate length of the Great Wall of China, including trenches, hills and rivers
- 9.259 Mm – length of the Trans-Siberian Railway

=== Sports ===
- The Munda Biddi Trail in Western Australia, Australia, is over 1,000 km long – the world's longest off-road cycle trail
- 1.200 Mm – the length of the Paris–Brest–Paris bicycling event
- Several endurance auto races are, or were, run for 1,000 km:
  - Bathurst 1000
  - 1000 km Brands Hatch
  - 1000 km Buenos Aires
  - 1000 km Donington
  - 1000 km Monza
  - 1000 km Nürburgring
  - 1000 km Silverstone
  - 1000 km Spa
  - 1000 km Suzuka
  - 1000 km Zeltweg

=== Geographical ===
- 1.010 Mm – distance from San Diego to El Paso as the crow flies
- 1.100 Mm – length of Italy
- 1.200 Mm – length of California
- 1.200 Mm – width of Texas
- 1.500 Mm – length of the Gobi Desert
- 1.600 Mm – length of the Namib, the oldest desert on Earth
- 2.000 Mm – distance from Beijing to Hong Kong as the crow flies
- 2.300 Mm – length of the Great Barrier Reef
- 2.800 Mm – narrowest width of Atlantic Ocean (Brazil-West Africa)
- 2.850 Mm – length of the Danube river
- 2.205 Mm – length of Sweden's total land boundaries
- 2.515 Mm – length of Norway's total land boundaries
- 3.690 Mm – length of the Volga river, longest in Europe
- 4.000 Mm – length of the Kalahari Desert
- 4.350 Mm – length of the Yellow River
- 4.600 Mm – width of the Mediterranean Sea
- 4.800 Mm – length of the Sahara
- 4.800 Mm – widest width of Atlantic Ocean (U.S.-Northern Africa)
- 5.100 Mm – distance from Dublin to New York as the crow flies
- 6.270 Mm – length of the Mississippi-Missouri River system
- 6.380 Mm – length of the Yangtze River
- 6.400 Mm – Length of the Amazon River
- 6.758 Mm – Length of the Nile system, longest on Earth
- 8.200 Mm – Approximate Distance from Dublin to San Francisco

=== Astronomical ===
- 1.000 Mm – estimated shortest axis of triaxial dwarf planet Haumea
- 1.186 Mm – diameter of Charon, the largest moon of Pluto
- 1.280 Mm – diameter of the trans-Neptunian object 50000 Quaoar
- 1.340 Mm – diameter of the trans-Neptunian object Makemake
- 1.436 Mm – diameter of Iapetus, one of Saturn's major moons
- 1.578 Mm – diameter of Titania, the largest of Uranus's moons
- 2.122 Mm – estimated longest axis of Haumea
- 2.326 Mm – diameter of the dwarf planet Eris, the most massive trans-Neptunian object found to date
- 2.376 Mm – diameter of Pluto
- 2.442 Mm – estimated diameter of Earth's Core.
- 2.707 Mm – diameter of Triton, largest moon of Neptune
- 3.122 Mm – diameter of Europa, the smallest Galilean satellite of Jupiter
- 3.476 Mm – diameter of Earth's Moon
- 3.643 Mm – diameter of Io, a moon of Jupiter
- 4.821 Mm – diameter of Callisto, a moon of Jupiter
- 4.879 Mm – diameter of Mercury
- 5.150 Mm – diameter of Titan, the largest moon of Saturn
- 5.262 Mm – diameter of Jupiter's moon Ganymede, the largest moon in the Solar System
- 6.371 Mm – radius of Earth
- 6.792 Mm – diameter of Mars

== 10 megametres ==
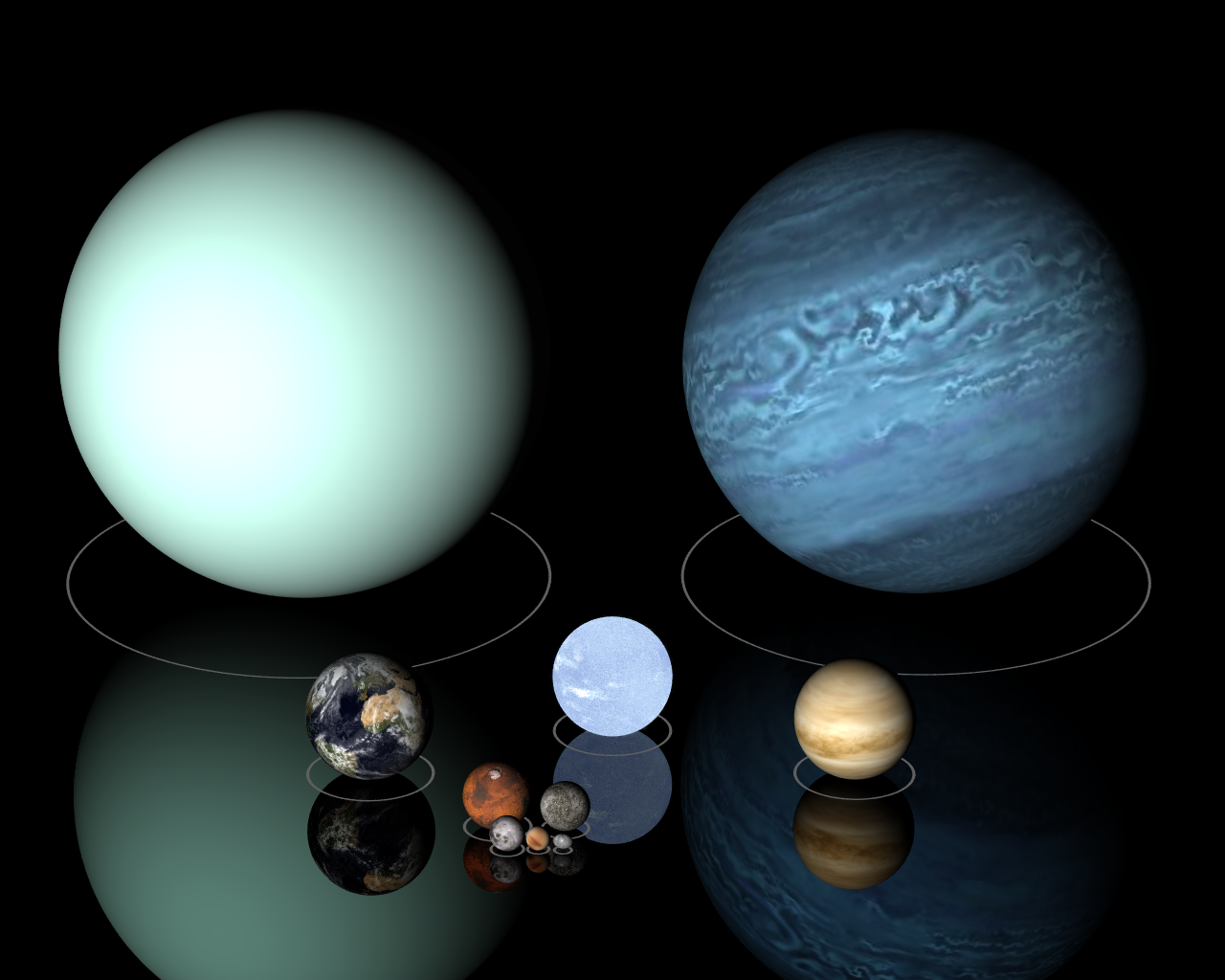
Planets from Venus up to Uranus have diameters from ten to one hundred million metres. Top row: Uranus (left), Neptune (right); middle row: Earth (left), Sirius B (center), and Venus (right), to scale.

To help compare different orders of magnitude, this section lists lengths starting at 10^{7} metres (10 megametres or 10,000 kilometres).

=== Conversions ===
10 megametres (10 Mm) is

- 6,215 miles
- side of a square of area 100,000,000 square kilometres (km^{2})
- radius of a circle of area 314,159,265 km^{2}

=== Human-defined scales and structures ===
- 11.085 Mm – length of the Kyiv-Vladivostok railway, a longer variant of the Trans-Siberian Railway
- 13.300 Mm – length of roads rehabilitated and widened under the National Highway Development Project (launched in 1998) in India
- 39.000 Mm – length of the SEA-ME-WE 3 optical submarine telecommunications cable, joining 39 points between Norden, Germany, and Okinawa, Japan
- 53.800 Mm — length of the BNSF Railway
- 67.000 Mm – total length of National Highways in India
- 80.000 Mm – 20,000 (metric, French) leagues (see Jules Verne, Twenty Thousand Leagues Under the Seas)
- 100.000 Mm — height of a Space elevator

=== Geographical ===
- 10 Mm – approximate altitude of the outer boundary of the exosphere
- 10.001 Mm – length of the meridian arc from the North Pole to the Equator (the original definition of the metre was based on this length)
- 40.000 Mm – length of the Ring of Fire
- 60.000 Mm – total length of the mid-ocean ridges

=== Astronomical ===
- 12.000 Mm — diameter of AR Scorpii, largest pulsar ever discovered
- 12.000 Mm – diameter of Sirius B, a white dwarf
- 12.104 Mm – diameter of Venus
- 12.742 Mm – diameter of Earth
- 12.900 Mm – minimum distance of the meteoroid 2004 FU162 from the centre of Earth on 31 March 2004, closest on record
- 14.000 Mm – smallest diameter of Jupiter's Great Red Spot
- 19.000 Mm – separation between Pluto and Charon
- 30.8568 Mm – 1 nanoparsec
- 34.770 Mm – minimum distance of the asteroid 99942 Apophis on 13 April 2029 from the centre of Earth
- 35.786 Mm – altitude of geostationary orbit
- 40.005 Mm – polar circumference of the Earth
- 40.077 Mm – equatorial circumference of the Earth
- 49.528 Mm – diameter of Neptune
- 51.118 Mm – diameter of Uranus

== 100 megametres ==
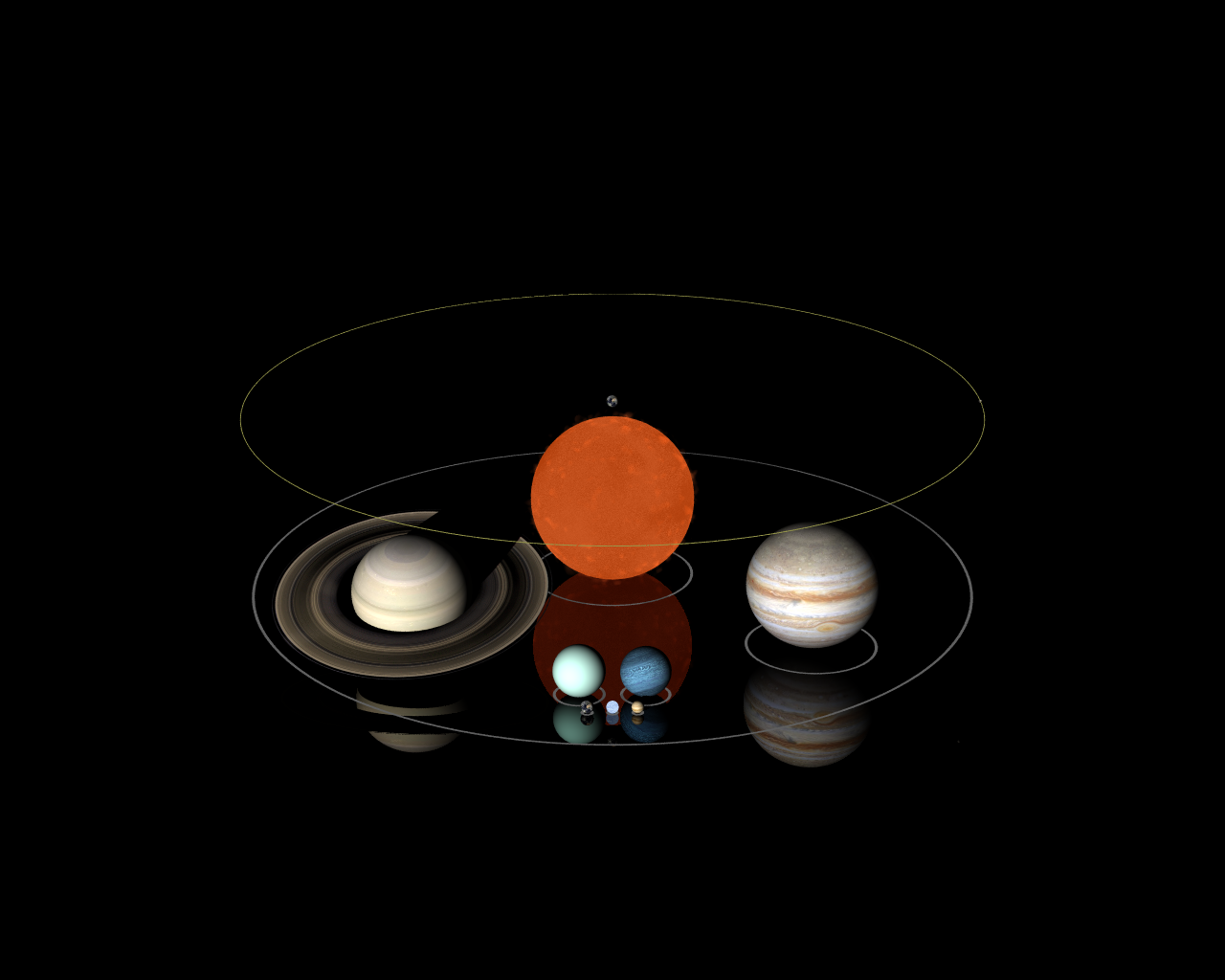
The Earth-Moon orbit, Saturn, OGLE-TR-122b, Jupiter, and other objects, to scale. Click on image for detailed view and links to other length scales.

Scale model at megametres of the main Solar System bodies

To help compare different orders of magnitude, this section lists lengths starting at 10^{8} metres (100 megametres or 100,000 kilometres or 62,150 miles).

- 102 Mm – diameter of Smertrios (HD 149026 b), an unusually dense Jovian planet
- 115 Mm – width of Saturn's Rings
- 120 Mm – diameter of EBLM J0555-57Ab, the smallest-known red dwarf
- 120 Mm – diameter of Saturn
- 142 Mm – diameter of Jupiter, the largest planet in the Solar System
- 146 Mm – diameter of WISE 0855–0714, the coldest known brown dwarf
- 170 Mm – diameter of TRAPPIST-1, a star discovered to have seven planets around it
- 170,5 Mm – diameter of SIMP0136, a rogue planet with auroral activity
- 174 Mm – diameter of OGLE-TR-122b, one of the smallest known stars
- 180 Mm – average distance covered during life
- 204,6 Mm – diameter of PSO J318.5–22 – a rogue planetary-mass object
- 215 Mm – diameter of Proxima Centauri, the nearest star to the Solar System
- 257 Mm – diameter of TrES-4b, one of the largest exoplanets
- 260 Mm – diameter of the Barnard's Star
- 272 Mm – diameter of WASP-12b
- 299.792 Mm – one light-second; the distance light travels in vacuum in one second (see speed of light)
- 314 Mm – diameter of CT Cha b
- 350. Mm – diameter of DH Tauri b, one of the largest exoplanets
- 384.4 Mm (238,855 mi) – average Earth–Moon distance
- 406.7 Mm - furthest distance travelled by humans from Earth, during the Artemis II mission
- 671 Mm – separation between Jupiter and Europa
- 696 Mm – radius of Sun
- 989 Mm – diameter of Epsilon Indi, one of the nearest stars to Earth

== 1 gigametre ==
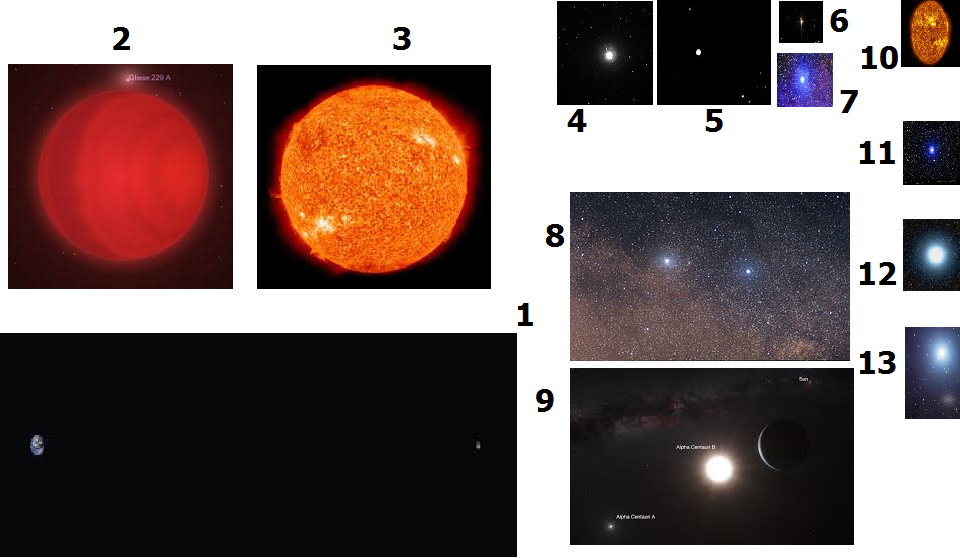
13 things in the gigametre group

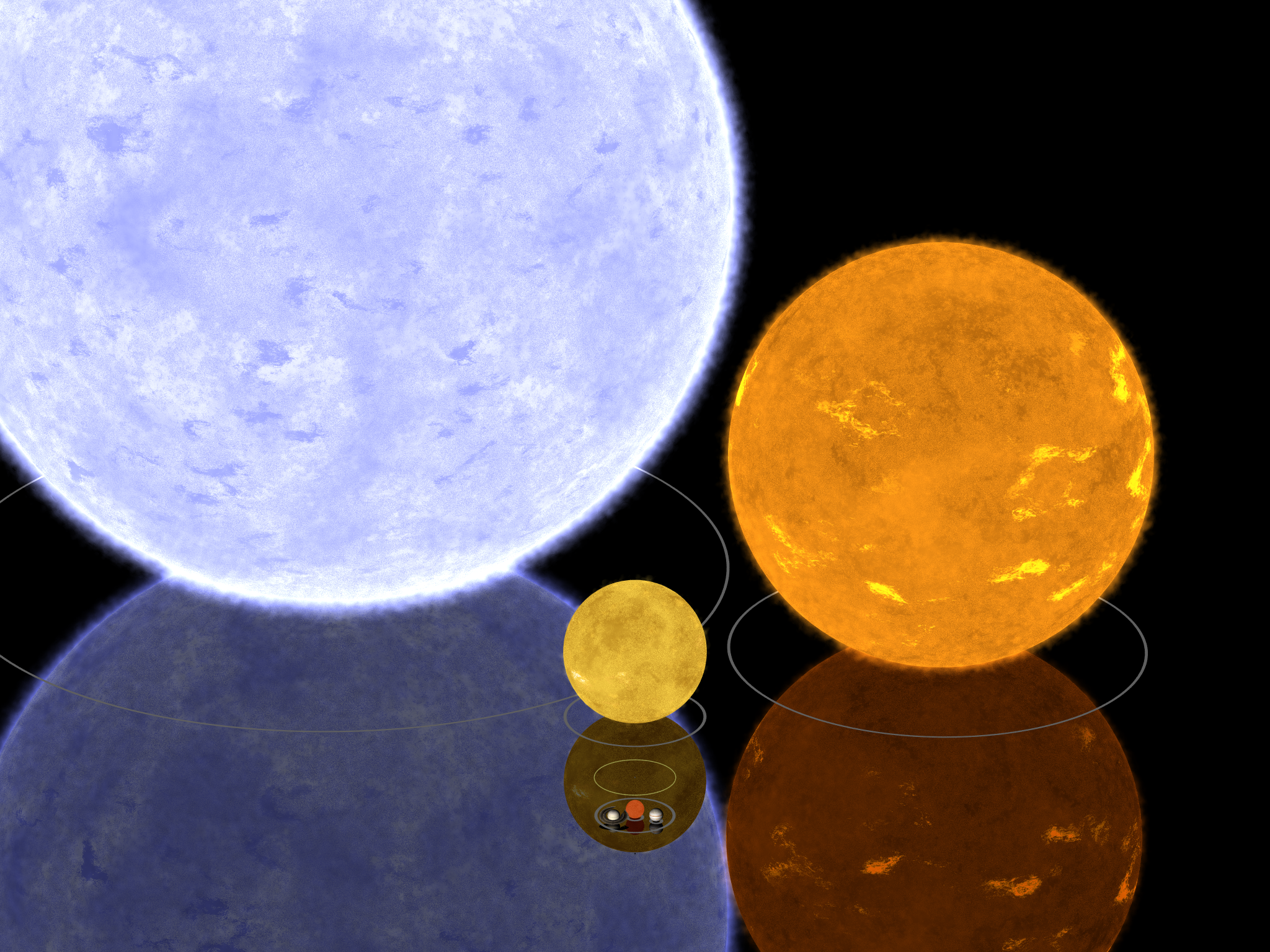
Upper part: Gamma Orionis, Algol B, the Sun (centre), and other objects to scale.

The gigametre (SI symbol: Gm) is a unit of length in the metric system equal to 1000000000 metres (10^{9} m). To help compare different distances this section lists lengths starting at 10^{9} metres (1 gigametre (Gm) or 1 billion metres).

- 1.2 Gm – separation between Saturn and Titan
- 1.39 Gm – diameter of Sun
- 1.5 Gm – orbit from Earth of the James Webb Space Telescope
- 1.71 Gm – diameter of Alpha Centauri A, one of the closest stars.
- 2.19 Gm – closest approach of Comet Lexell to Earth, happened on 1 July 1770; closest comet approach on record
- 2.38 Gm – diameter of Sirius A, brightest naked eye star.
- 3 Gm – total length of "wiring" in the human brain
- 3.5 Gm – diameter of Vega
- 4.2 Gm – diameter of Algol B
- 4.3 Gm – circumference of Sun
- 5.0 Gm – closest approach of Comet Halley to Earth, happened on 10 April 837
- 5.0 Gm – (proposed) Size of the arms of the giant triangle shaped Michelson interferometre of the Laser Interferometer Space Antenna (LISA) planned to start observations sometime in the 2030s.
- 7.9 Gm – diameter of Bellatrix, a blue dwarf or blue giant
- 9.0 Gm – estimated diameter of the event horizon of Sagittarius A*, the supermassive black hole in the center of the Milky Way galaxy

== 10 gigametres ==
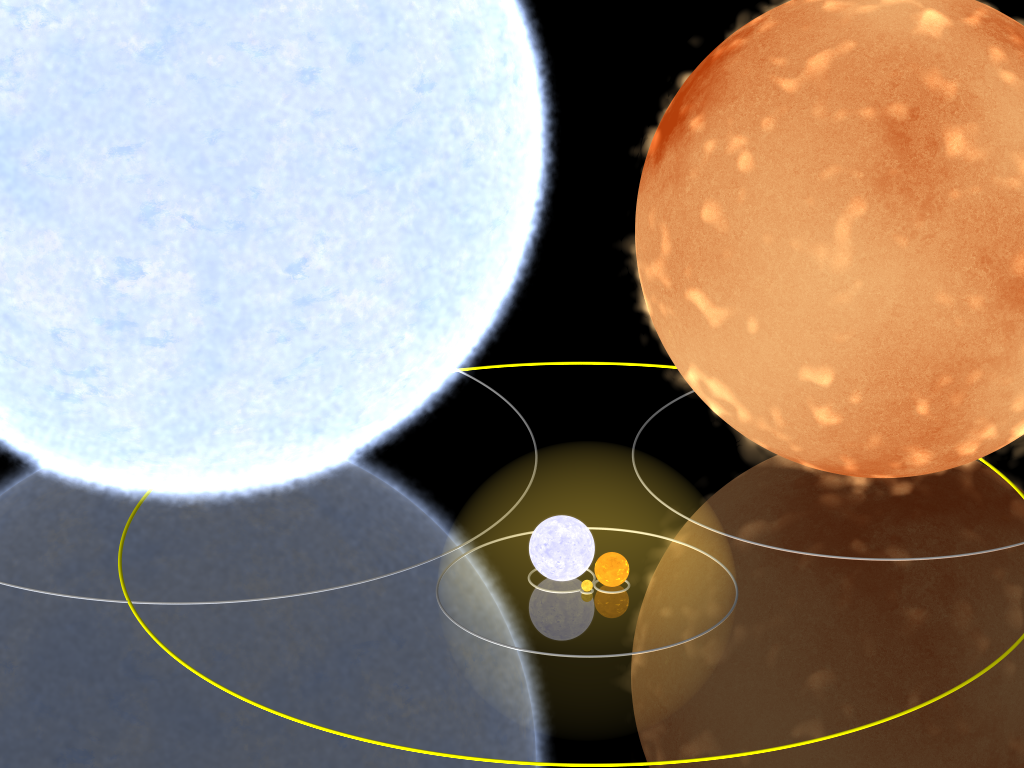
Rigel and Aldebaran (top left and right) compared to smaller stars, the Sun (very small dot in lower middle, with orbit of Mercury as yellow ellipse) and transparent sphere with radius of one light-minute

To help compare different distances this section lists lengths starting at 10^{10} metres (10 gigametres (Gm) or 10 million kilometres, or 0.07 astronomical units).

- 10.4 Gm – diameter of Spica, an oval-shaped blue giant star and a nearby supernova candidate.
- 12.6 Gm – diameter of Pollux, the closest red giant star to the Sun. It is a red clump star fusing helium into carbon at its core.
- 15 Gm – closest distance of Comet Hyakutake from Earth
- 18 Gm – one light-minute (see yellow sphere in right-hand diagram)
- 24 Gm – radius of a heliostationary orbit
- 30.8568 Gm – 1 microparsec
- 35 Gm – approximate diameter of Arcturus, a close red giant star. It is on the red giant branch, fusing hydrogen into helium in a shell surrounding an inert helium core.
- 46 Gm – perihelion distance of Mercury (yellow ellipse on the right)
- 55 Gm – 60,000-year perigee of Mars (last achieved on 27 August 2003)
- 58 Gm – average passing distance between Earth and Mars at the moment they overtake each other in their orbits
- 61 Gm – diameter of Aldebaran, a red giant branch star (large star on right)
- 70 Gm – aphelion distance of Mercury
- 76 Gm – Neso's apocentric distance; greatest distance of a natural satellite from its parent planet (Neptune)

== 100 gigametres ==
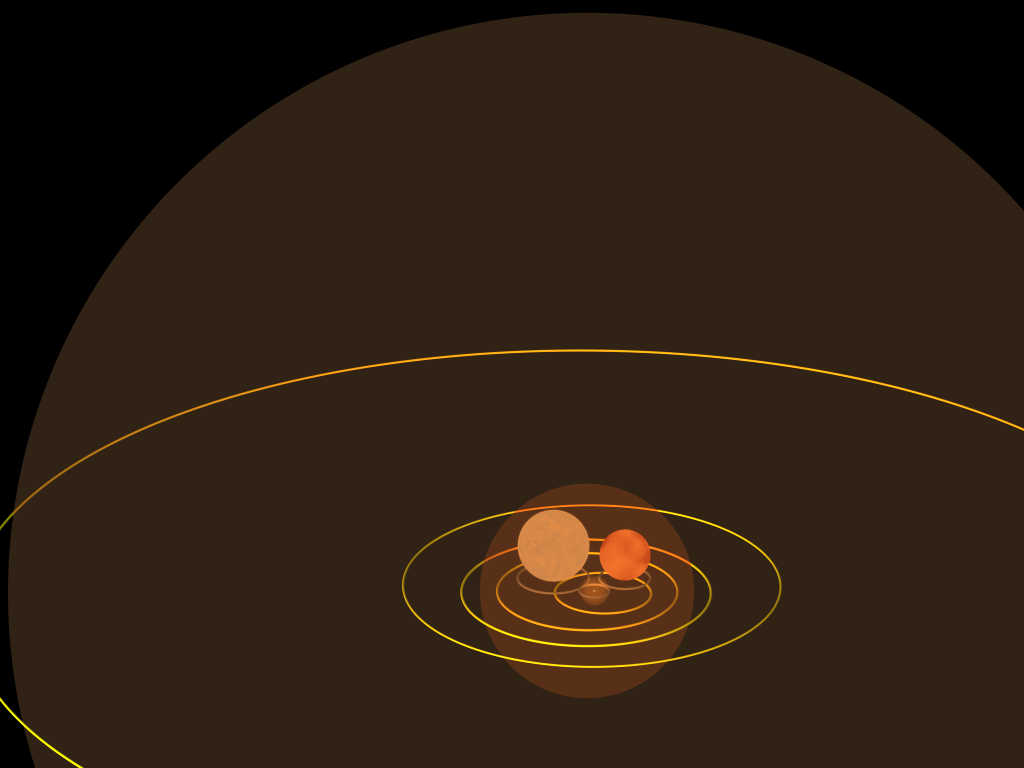
From largest to smallest: Jupiter's orbit, red supergiant star Betelgeuse, Mars' orbit, Earth's orbit, star R Doradus, and orbits of Venus, Mercury. Inside R Doradus's depiction are the blue supergiant star Rigel and red giant star Aldebaran. The faint yellow glow around the Sun represents one light-minute. Click image to see more details and links to their scales.

To help compare distances at different orders of magnitude this section lists lengths starting at 10^{11} metres (100 gigametre or 100 million kilometres or 0.7 astronomical units).

- 103 Gm (0.69 au) – diameter of Rigel
- 109 Gm (0.7 au) – distance between Venus and the Sun
- 149.6 Gm (93.0 million mi; 1.0 au) – average distance between the Earth and the Sun – the original definition of the astronomical unit
- 163 Gm (1.09 au) – diameter of Deneb, a blue supergiant
- 228 Gm (1.5 au) – distance between Mars and the Sun
- 255 Gm (1.7 au) – diameter of Enif, a small red supergiant star in the constellation Pegasus
- 430 Gm (2.9 au) – diameter of the Pistol Star, a blue hypergiant star
- 511 Gm (3.4 au) – average diameter of Mira, a pulsating red giant and the progenitor of the Mira variables. It is an asymptotic giant branch star.
- 570 Gm (3.8 au) – length of the tail of Comet Hyakutake measured by Ulysses; the actual value could be much higher
- 591 Gm (4.0 au) – minimum distance between the Earth and Jupiter
- 780 Gm (5.2 au) – average distance between Jupiter and the Sun
- 880 Gm (5.9 au) – diameter of Rho Cassiopeiae, a rare yellow hypergiant star

- 947 Gm (6.4 au) – diameter of Antares A
- 965 Gm (6.4 au) – maximum distance between the Earth and Jupiter

== 1 terametre ==
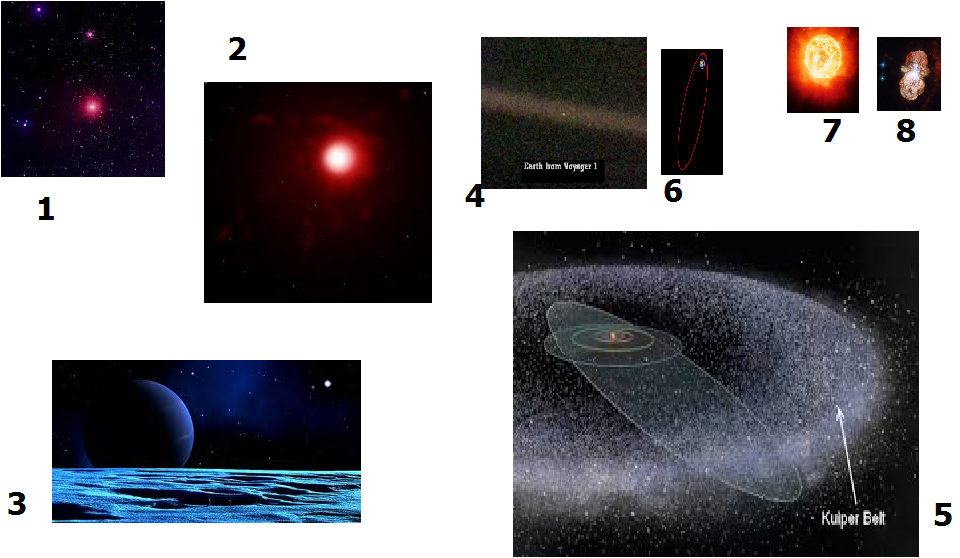
Eight things in the terametre group

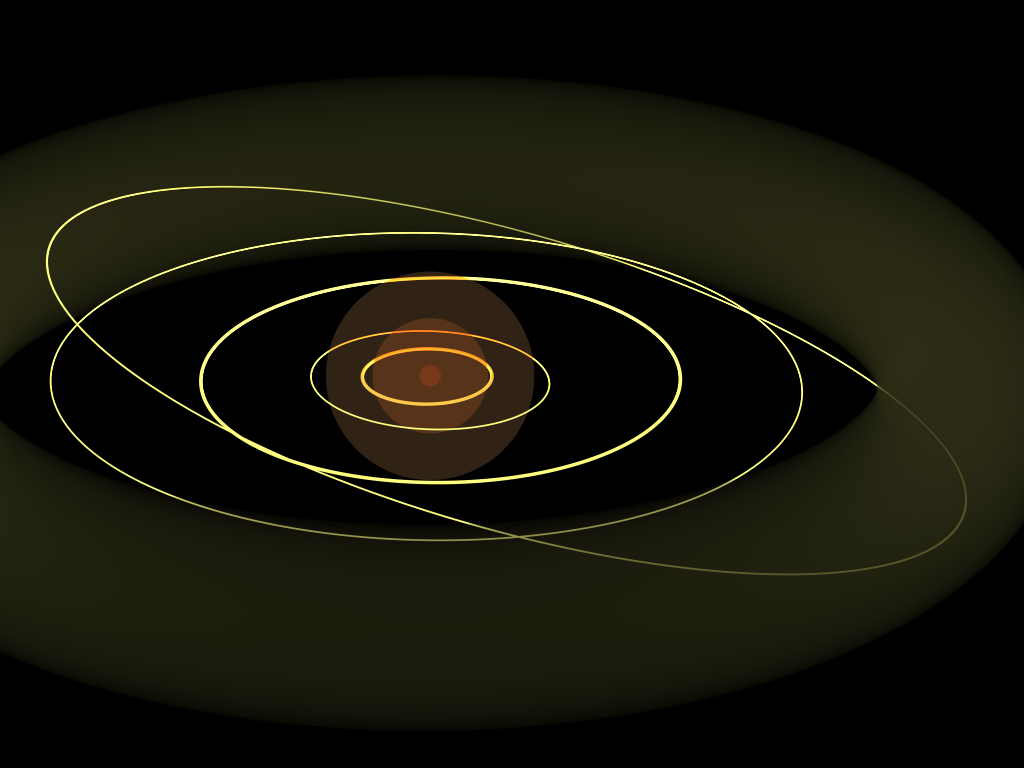
Comparison of size of the Kuiper belt (large faint torus) with the star VY Canis Majoris (within Saturn's orbit), Betelgeuse (inside Jupiter's orbit) and R Doradus (small central red sphere) together with the orbits of Neptune and Uranus, to scale. The yellow ellipses represent the orbits of each planet and the dwarf planet Pluto.

The terametre (SI symbol: Tm) is a unit of length in the metric system equal to 1000000000000 metres (10^{12} m). To help compare different distances, this section lists lengths starting at 10^{12} m (1 Tm or 1 billion km or 6.7 astronomical units).

- ≈1 Tm – 6.7 au – diameter of the red supergiant Betelgeuse based on multiple angular diameter estimates
- 1.06 Tm – 7.1 au – estimated diameter of Mu Cephei, a red supergiant (possibly hypergiant) among the largest-known stars.
- 1.079 Tm – 7.2 au – one light-hour
- 1.4 Tm – 9.3 au – diameter of the blue hypergiant Eta Carinae (at optical depth 2/3)
- 1.4 Tm – 9.5 au – average distance between Saturn and the Sun
- 1.5 Tm – 10 au – estimated diameter of VV Cephei A, a red supergiant (possibly a hypergiant) with a hot companion.
- 1.83 Tm – 12.2 au – diameter of HR 5171 A, a yellow hypergiant star
- 2 Tm – 13.2 au – estimated diameter of VY Canis Majoris, a red hypergiant that is among the largest-known stars
- 2.14 Tm – 14.3 au – estimated diameter of WOH G64 A, possibly the largest star known in the Large Magellanic Cloud.
- 2.56 Tm – 17.1 au – estimated diameter of Stephenson 2 DFK 1, the largest star in the Galaxy.
- 2.9 Tm – 19.4 au – average distance between Uranus and the Sun
- 4.4 Tm – 29.4 au – perihelion distance of Pluto
- 4.5 Tm – 30.1 au – average distance between Neptune and the Sun
- 4.5 Tm – 30.1 au – inner radius of the Kuiper belt
- 5.7 Tm – 38.1 au – perihelion distance of Eris
- 6.0 Tm – 40.5 au – distance from Earth at which the Pale Blue Dot photograph was taken.
- 7.3 Tm – 48.8 au – aphelion distance of Pluto
- 7.5 Tm – 50.1 au – outer boundary of the Kuiper Belt

== 10 terametres ==
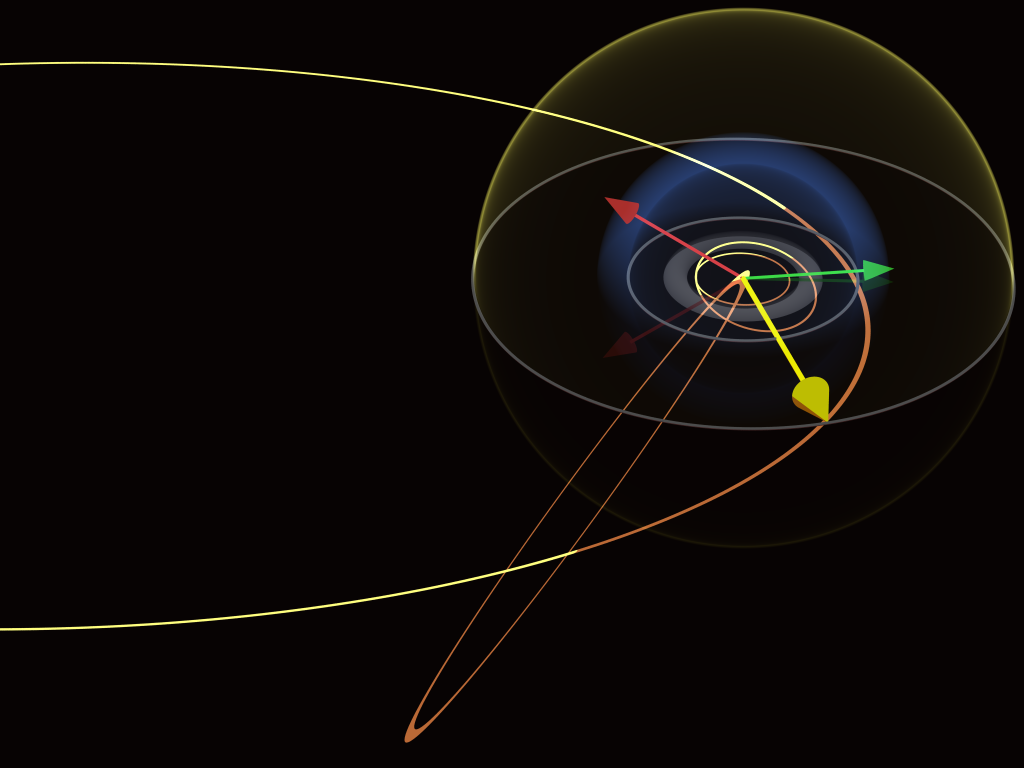
Sedna's orbit (left) is longer than 100 Tm, but other lengths are between 10 and 100 Tm: Comet Hale-Bopp's orbit (lower, faint orange); one light-day (yellow spherical shell with yellow Vernal point arrow as radius); the heliosphere's termination shock (blue shell); and other arrows show positions of Voyager 1 (red) and Pioneer 10 (green). Click on image for larger view and links to other scales.

To help compare different distances this section lists lengths starting at 10^{13} m (10 Tm or 10 billion km or 67 astronomical units).

- 10 Tm – 67 AU – diameter of a hypothetical quasi-star
- 11.1 Tm – 74.2 AU – distance that Voyager 1 began detecting returning particles from termination shock
- 11.4 Tm – 76.2 AU – perihelion distance of 90377 Sedna
- 12.1 Tm – 70 to 90 AU – distance to termination shock (Voyager 1 crossed at 94 AU)
- 12.9 Tm – 86.3 AU – distance to 90377 Sedna in March 2014
- 13.2 Tm – 88.6 AU – distance to Pioneer 11 in March 2014
- 14.1 Tm – 94.3 AU – estimated radius of the Solar System
- 14.4 Tm – 96.4 AU – distance to Eris in March 2014 (now near its aphelion)
- 15.1 Tm – 101 AU – distance to heliosheath
- 16.5 Tm – 111 AU – distance to Pioneer 10 as of March 2014
- 16.6 Tm – 111.2 AU – distance to Voyager 2 as of May 2016
- 18 Tm – 123.5 AU – distance between the Sun to the farthest dwarf planet in the Solar System, the Farout 2018 VG18
- 19.5 Tm – 132.7 AU – distance between the Sun to one of the farthest known objects in the solar system, 2018 AG37 (FarFarOut)
- 20.0 Tm – 135 AU – distance to Voyager 1 as of May 2016
- 20.6 Tm – 138 AU – distance to Voyager 1 as of late February 2017
- 21 Tm – 140 AU – distance to Voyager 2 as of August 2025
- 21.1 Tm – 141 AU – distance to Voyager 1 as of November 2017
- 21.6 Tm – 144 AU – distance to Voyager 2 as of October 2026
- 25.1 Tm – 168 AU – distance to Voyager 1 as of August 2025
- 25.8 Tm – 172.3 AU – distance to Voyager 1 as of October 2026
- 25.9 Tm – 173 AU – one light-day
- 30.8568 Tm – 206.3 AU – 1 milliparsec
- 55.7 Tm – 371 AU – aphelion distance of the comet Hale-Bopp

== 100 terametres ==
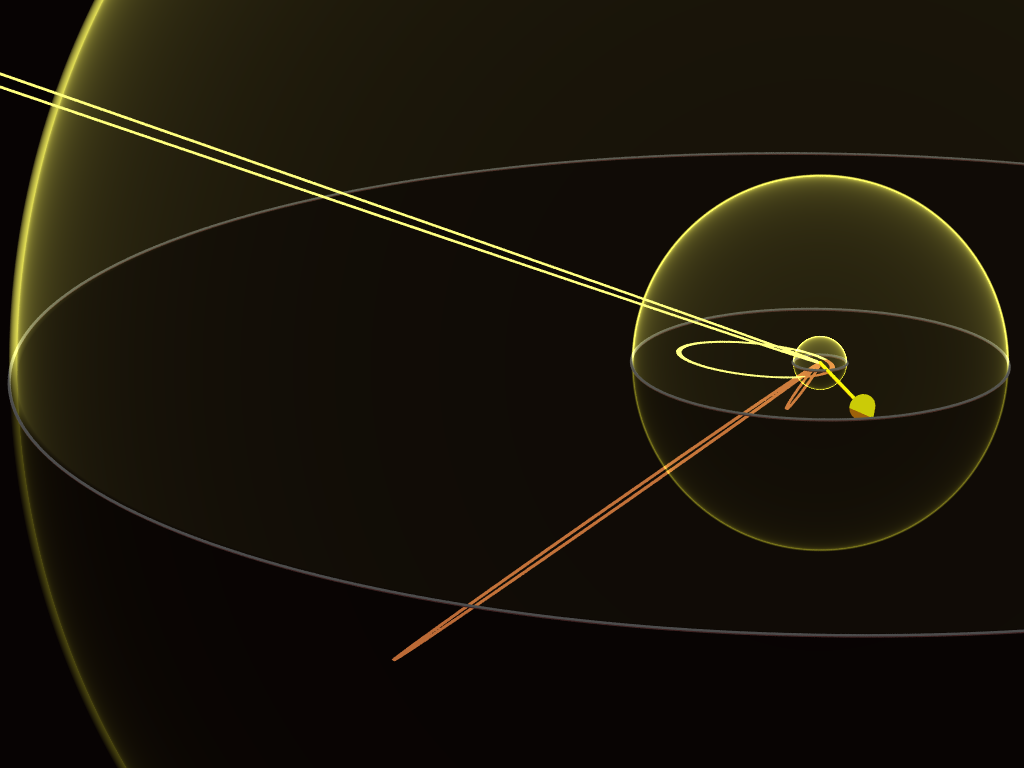
The largest yellow sphere indicates one light month distance from the Sun. Click the image for larger view, more details and links to other scales.

To help compare different distances this section lists lengths starting at 10^{14} m (100 Tm or 100 billion km or 670 astronomical units).

- 140 Tm – 937 AU – aphelion distance of 90377 Sedna
- 142.1 Tm – 950 AU – average distance of the hypothetical Planet 9.
- 172 Tm – 1150 AU – Schwarzschild diameter of H1821+643, one of the most massive black holes known
- 181 Tm – 1210 AU – one light-week
- 240.4 Tm – 1607 AU – approximate Schwarzschild diameter of TON-618, previously the most massive black hole.
- 308.568 Tm – 2063 AU – 1 centiparsec
- 577.2 Tm – 3859 AU – Schwarzschild diameter of the ultramassive Black Hole in the center of the Supergiant Elliptical Galaxy IC1101.
- 590.8 Tm – 3949 AU – Schwarzschild diameter of Phoenix A, the most massive black hole ever discovered.
- 757 Tm – 5059 AU – radius of the Stingray Nebula
- 777 Tm – 5180 AU – one light-month

== 1 petametre ==
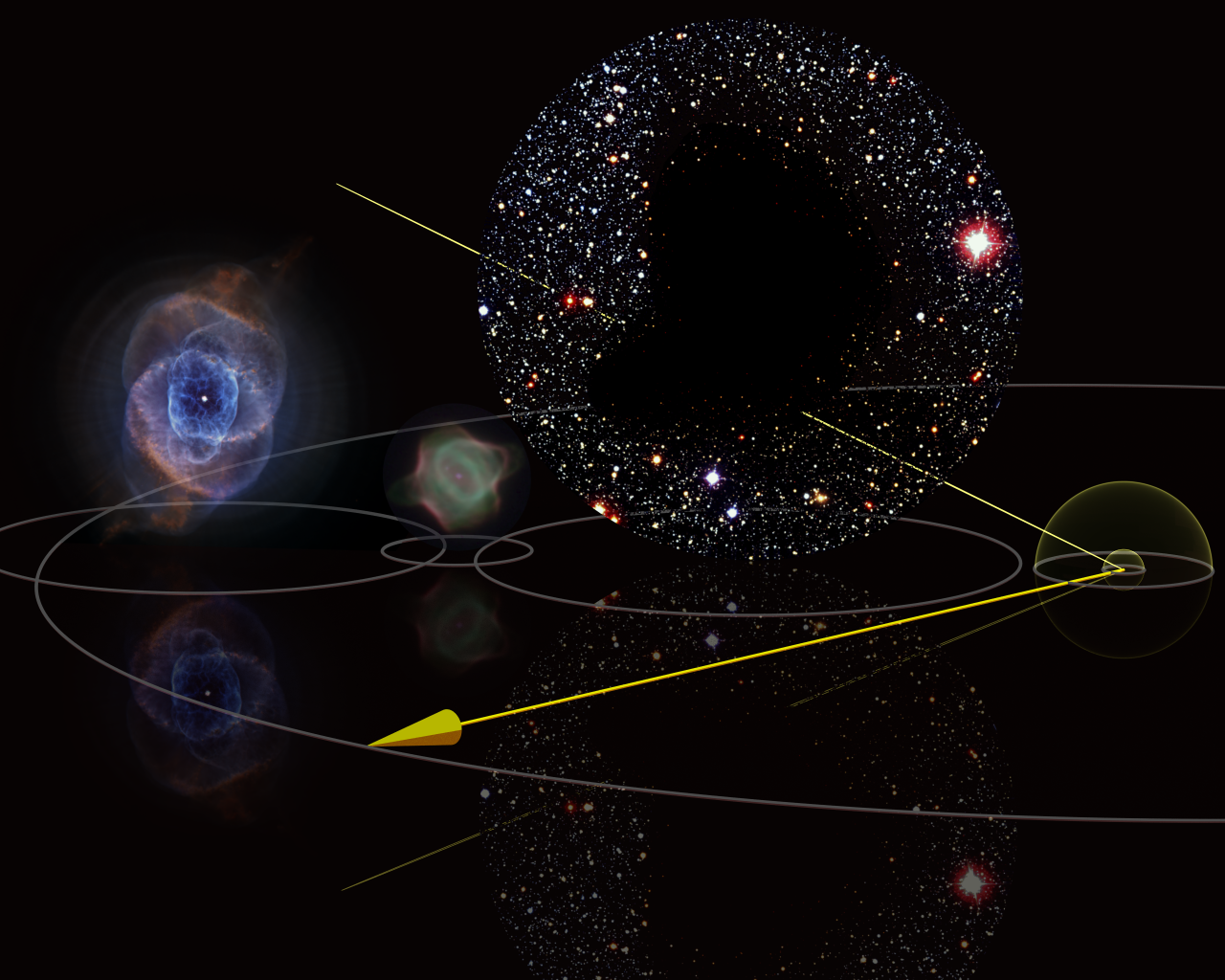
Largest circle with yellow arrow indicates one light-year from Sun; Cat's Eye Nebula on left and Barnard 68 in middle are depicted in front of Comet 1910 A1's orbit. Click image for larger view, details and links to other scales.

The petametre (SI symbol: Pm) is a unit of length in the metric system equal to 10^{15} metres. To help compare different distances this section lists lengths starting at 10^{15} m (1 Pm or 1 trillion km or 6685 astronomical units (AU) or 0.11 light-years).

- 1.0 Pm = 0.105702341 light-years
- 1.9 Pm ± 0.5 Pm = 12,000 AU = 0.2 light-year radius of Cat's Eye Nebula's inner core
- 3.08568 Pm = 20,626 AU = 1 deciparsec
- 4.7 Pm = 30,000 AU = half-light-year diameter of Bok globule Barnard 68
- 7.5 Pm – 50,000 AU – possible outer boundary of Oort cloud (other estimates are 75,000 to 125,000 or even 189,000 AU (1.18, 2, and 3 light-years, respectively))
- 9.5 Pm – 63,241.1 AU – one light-year, the distance light travels in one year
- 9.9 Pm – 66,000 AU – aphelion distance of the C/1999 F1 (Catalina)

== 10 petametres ==
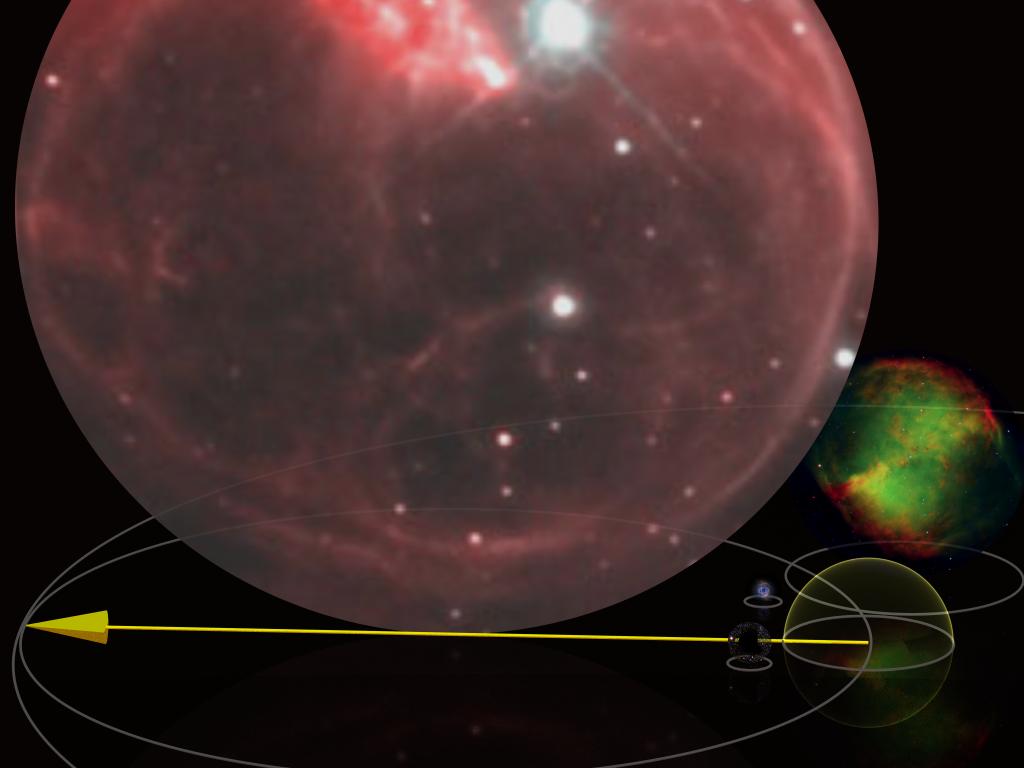
Objects with size order of magnitude 1e16m: Ten light-years (94.6 Pm) radius circle with yellow Vernal Point arrow; Bubble Nebula (NGC 7635), left; Dumbbell Nebula (NGC 6853), right; one light-year shell lower right with the smaller Cat's Eye Nebula (NGC_6543) and Barnard 68 adjacent.

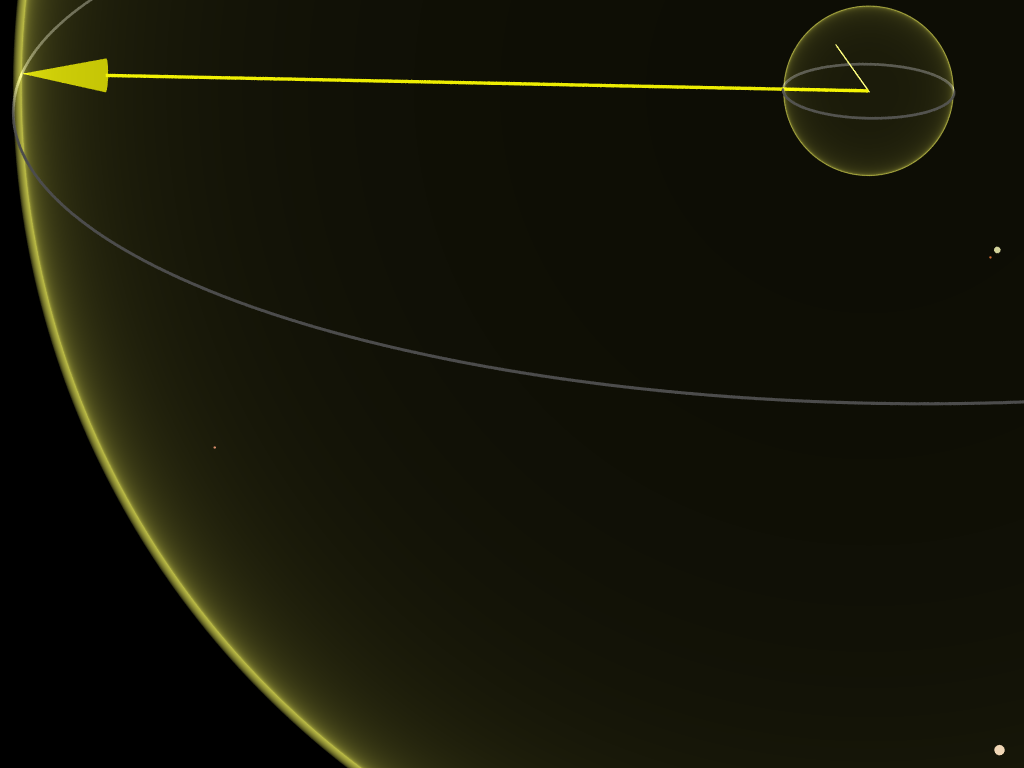
1e16m lengths: Ten light-years (94.6 Pm) yellow shell; Sirius below right; BL Ceti below left; Proxima and Alpha Centauri upper right; light-year shell with Comet 1910 A1's orbit inside top right

To help compare different distances this section lists lengths starting at 10^{16} m (10 Pm or 66,800 AU, 1.06 light-years).

- 15 Pm – 1.59 light-years – possible outer radius of Oort cloud
- 20 Pm – 2.11 light-years – maximum extent of influence of the Sun's gravitational field
- 30.9 Pm – 3.26 light-years – 1 parsec
- 39.9 Pm – 4.22 light-years – distance to Proxima Centauri (nearest star to Sun)
- 81.3 Pm – 8.59 light-years – distance to Sirius
- 94.6 Pm – 1 light-decade

== 100 petametres ==
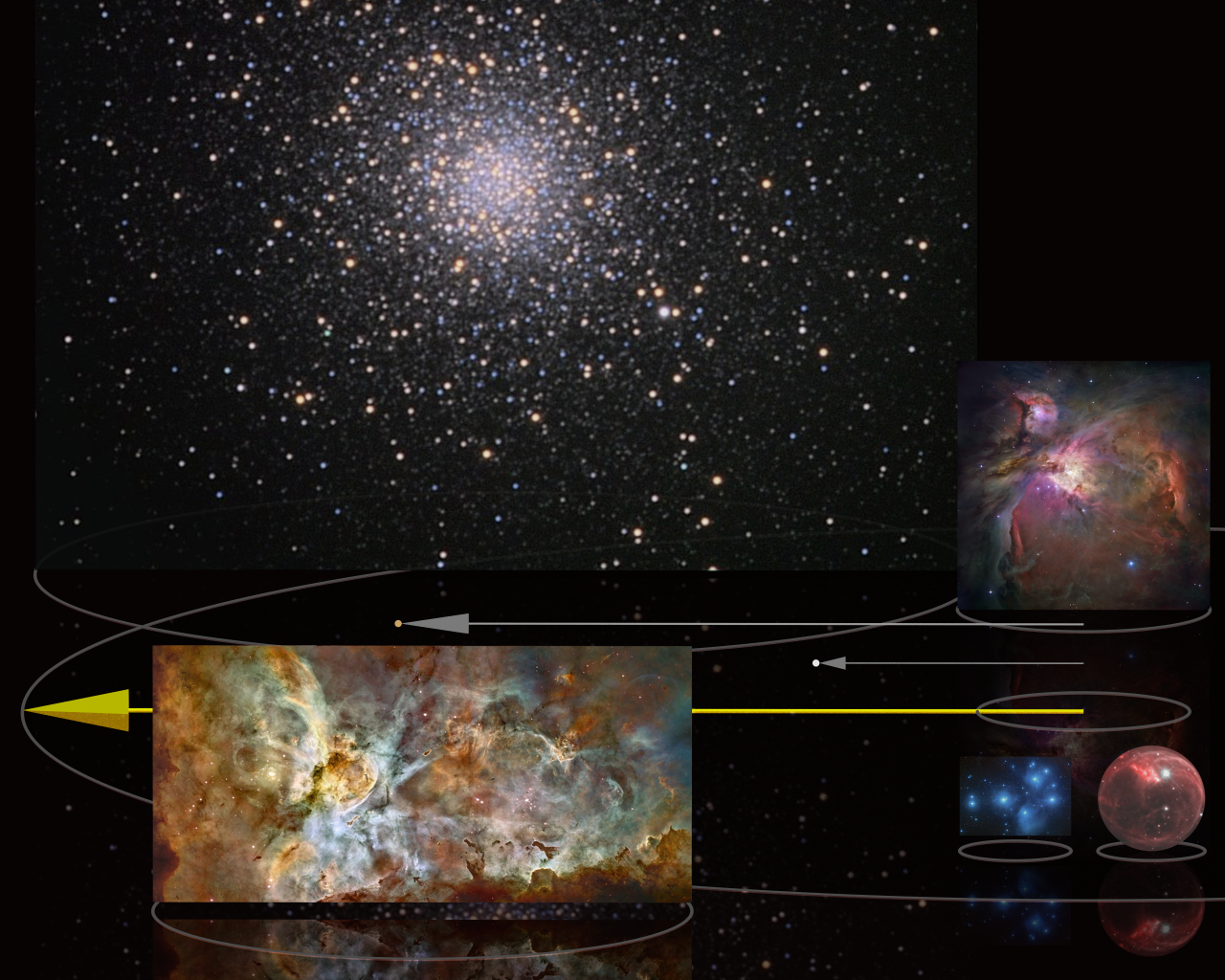
Lengths with order of magnitude 1e17m: yellow Vernal Point arrow traces hundred light-year radius circle with smaller ten light-year circle at right; globular cluster Messier 5 in background; 12 light-year radius Orion Nebula middle right; 50-light-year-wide view of the Carina Nebula bottom left; Pleiades cluster and Bubble nebula with similar diameters each around 10 light-years bottom right; grey arrows show distances from Sun to stars Aldebaran (65 light-years) and Vega (25 light-years)

To help compare different distances this section lists lengths between 10^{17} m (100 Pm or 11 light-years) and 10^{18} m (106 light-years).

- 110 Pm – 12 light-years – Distance to Tau Ceti
- 230 Pm – 24 light-years – diameter of the Orion Nebula
- 240 Pm – 25 light-years – Distance to Vega
- 260 Pm – 27 light-years – Distance to Chara, a star approximately as bright as the Sun. Its faintness gives an idea how the Sun would appear when viewed from this distance.
- 308.568 Tm – 32.6 light-years – 1 dekaparsec
- 350 Pm – 37 light-years – distance to Arcturus
- 373.1 Pm – 39.44 light-years – distance to TRAPPIST-1, a star recently discovered to have 7 planets around it
- 400 Pm – 42 light-years – distance to Capella
- 620 Pm – 65 light-years – distance to Aldebaran
- 750 Pm – 79.36 light-years – distance to Regulus
- 900 Pm – 92.73 light-years – distance to Algol
- 946 Pm – 1 light-century

== 1 exametre ==
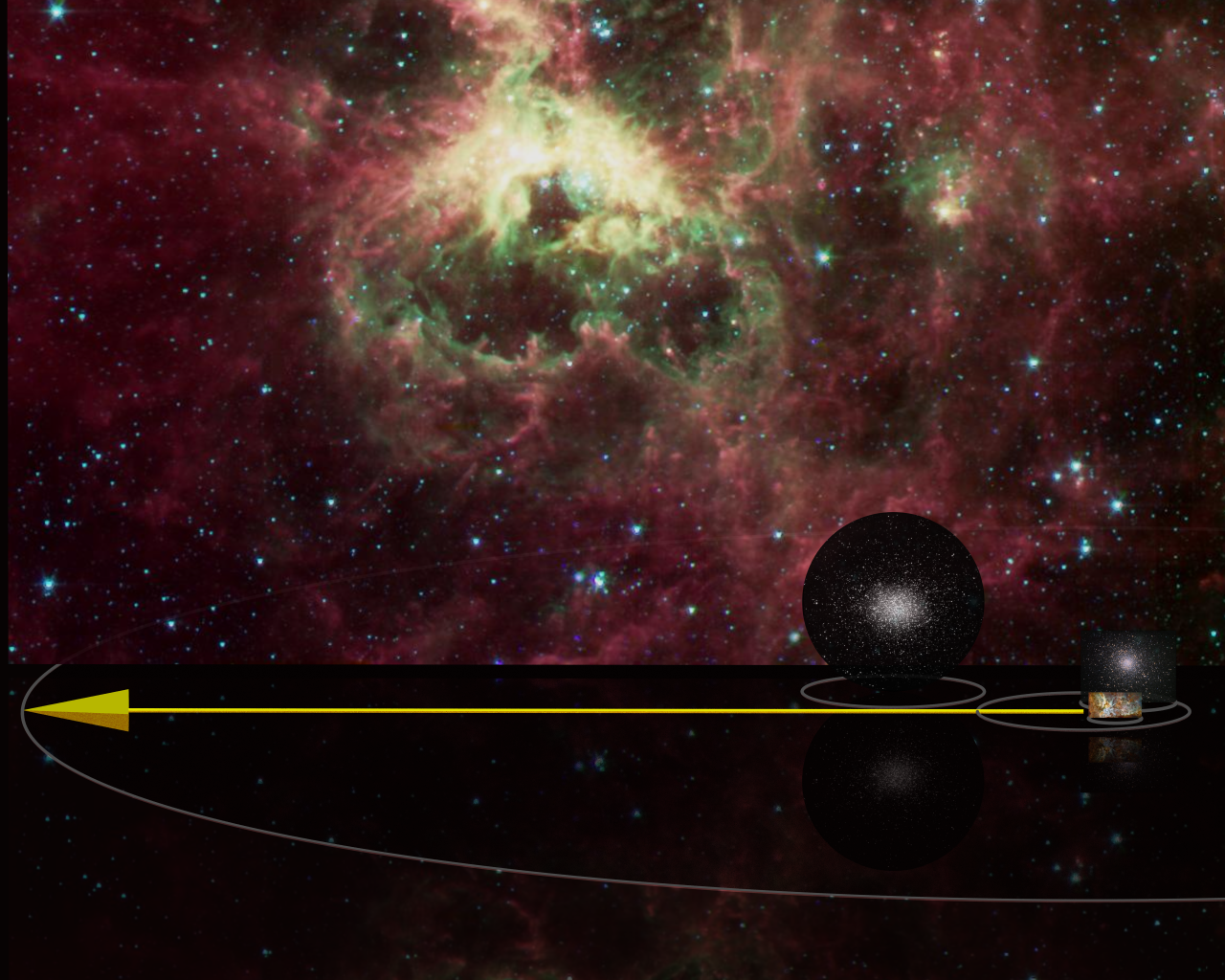
Lengths with order of magnitude 1e18m: thousand light-year radius circle with yellow arrow and 100 light-year circle at right with globular cluster Messier 5 within and Carina Nebula in front; globular cluster Omega Centauri to left of both; part of the 1,400-light-year-wide Tarantula Nebula fills the background

The exametre (SI symbol: Em) is a unit of length in the metric system equal to 10^{18} metres. To help compare different distances this section lists lengths between 10^{18} m (1 Em or 105.7 light-years) and 10^{19} m (10 Em or 1,057 light-years).

- 1.2 Em – 129 light-years – diameter of Messier 13 (a typical globular cluster)
- 1.6 Em – 172 ± 12.5 light-years – diameter of Omega Centauri (one of the largest-known globular clusters, perhaps containing over a million stars)
- 3.08568 Em – 326.1 light-years – 1 hectoparsec
- 3.1 Em – 310 light-years – distance to Canopus according to Hipparcos
- 3.9 Em – 410 light-years – distance to Betelgeuse according to Hipparcos
- 6.2 Em – 650 light-years – distance to the Helix Nebula, located in the constellation Aquarius
- 8.2 Em – 860 light-years – distance to Rigel according to Hipparcos
- 9.4 Em — 1 light-millennium – 1,000 light-years

== 10 exametres ==
To help compare different orders of magnitude, this section lists distances starting at 10 Em (10^{19} m or 1,100 light-years).

- 10.6 Em – 1,120 light-years – distance to WASP-96b
- 13 Em – 1,300 light-years – distance to the Orion Nebula
- 14 Em – 1,500 light-years – approximate thickness of the plane of the Milky Way galaxy at the Sun's location
- 14.2 Em – 1,520 light-years – diameter of the NGC 604
- 30.8568 Em – 3,261.6 light-years – 1 kiloparsec
- 31 Em – 3,200 light-years – distance to Deneb according to Hipparcos
- 46 Em – 4,900 light-years – distance to OGLE-TR-56, the first extrasolar planet discovered using the transit method
- 47 Em – 5,000 light-years – distance to the Boomerang Nebula, coldest place known (1 K)
- 53 Em – 5,600 light-years – distance to the globular cluster M4 and the extrasolar planet PSR B1620-26 b within it
- 61 Em – 6,500 light-years – distance to Perseus Spiral Arm (next spiral arm out in the Milky Way galaxy)
- 71 Em – 7,500 light-years – distance to Eta Carinae
- 94.6073 Em – 1 light-decamillennium = 10,000 light-years

== 100 exametres ==
To help compare different orders of magnitude, this section lists distances starting at 100 Em (10^{20} m or 11,000 light-years).

- 150 Em – 16,000 light-years – diameter of the Small Magellanic Cloud, a dwarf galaxy orbiting the Milky Way
- 200 Em – 21,500 light-years – distance to OGLE-2005-BLG-390Lb
- 240 Em – 25,000 light-years – distance to the Canis Major Dwarf Galaxy
- 260 Em – 28,000 light-years – distance to the center of the Galaxy
- 400 Em – 48,000 light-years – diameter of the Fireworks Galaxy
- 830 Em – 87,400 light-years – diameter of the Milky Way Galaxy.
- 830 Em – 88,000 light-years – distance to the Sagittarius Dwarf Elliptical Galaxy
- 946 Em – 1 light-centum-millennium = 100,000 light-years

== 1 zettametre ==
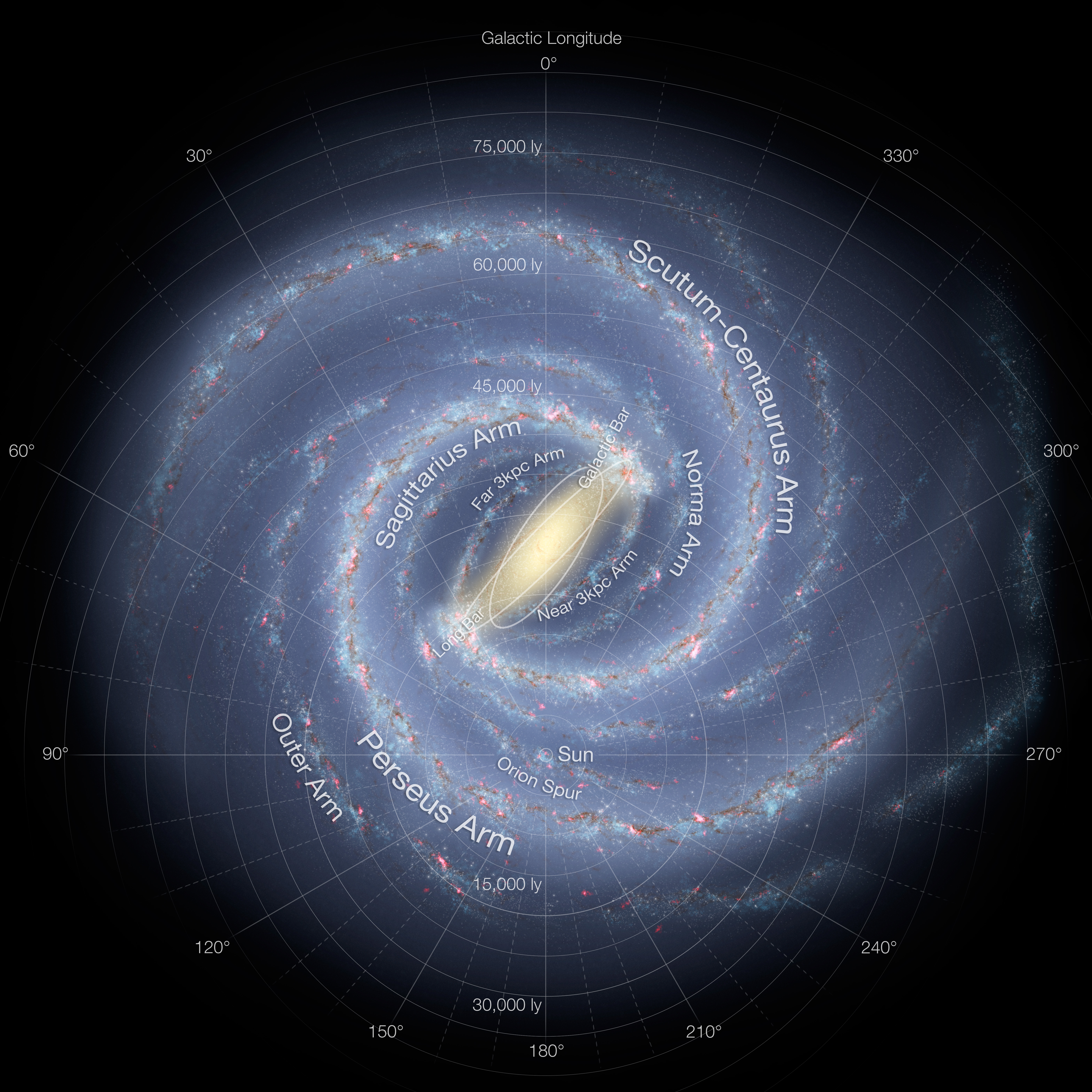
The Milky Way galaxy shown with the sun located on the smallermost circle

The zettametre (SI symbol: Zm) is a unit of length in the metric system equal to 10^{21} metres. To help compare different orders of magnitude, this section lists distances starting at 1 Zm (10^{21} m or 110,000 light-years).

- 1.4 Zm – 152,000 light-years – diameter of the Andromeda Galaxy, the nearest major galaxy.
- 1.7 Zm – 179,000 light-years – distance to the Large Magellanic Cloud, largest satellite galaxy of the Milky Way
- 2.0 Zm – 210,000 light-years – distance to the Small Magellanic Cloud.
- 2.8 Zm – 300,000 light-years – distance to the Intergalactic Wanderer, one of the most distant globular clusters of the Milky Way
- 8.5 Zm – 900,000 light-years – distance to the Leo I Dwarf Galaxy, farthest-known Milky Way satellite galaxy
- 9.5 Zm – 1 light-megaannum = 1,000,000 light-years

== 10 zettametres ==
Image of the Local Group, a region of the universe within ten million light-years of Earth

To help compare different orders of magnitude, this section lists distances starting at 10 Zm (10^{22} m or 1.1 million light-years).

- 16.7 Zm – 1.76 million light-years – diameter of the Galaxy ESO 383-76, one of the largest galaxies known.
- 24 Zm – 2.5 million light-years – distance to the Andromeda Galaxy, the nearest major galaxy.
- 27 Zm – 2.9 million light-years – distance to the Triangulum Galaxy.
- 30.8568 Zm – 3.2616 million light-years – 1 megaparsec
- 37 Zm – 4 million light-years – the diameter of the diffuse halo of IC 1101, a supergiant galaxy located in Abell 2029.
- 40 Zm – 4.2 million light-years – distance to the IC 10, a distant member of the Local Group of galaxies
- 95 Zm – 10 million light-years – distance to the Sculptor Galaxy in the Sculptor Group of galaxies
- 95 Zm – 10 million light-years – distance to the Maffei 1, the nearest giant elliptical galaxy in the Maffei 1 Group

== 100 zettametres ==
To help compare different orders of magnitude, this section lists distances starting at 100 Zm (10^{23} m or 11 million light-years).

- 140 Zm – 15 million light-years – distance to Centaurus A galaxy
- 150 Zm – 16 million light-years – length of the entire structure of the Alcyoneus Galaxy.
- 160 Zm – 17 million light-years – diameter of the Local Group of galaxies
- 250 Zm – 27 million light-years – distance to the Pinwheel Galaxy
- 280 Zm – 30 million light-years – distance to the Sombrero Galaxy
- 570 Zm – 60 million light-years – approximate distance to the Virgo Cluster, nearest galaxy cluster
- 620 Zm – 65 million light-years – approximate distance to the Fornax Cluster
- 800 Zm – 85 million light-years – approximate distance to the Eridanus Cluster

== 1 yottametre ==
The yottametre (SI symbol: Ym) is a unit of length in the metric system equal to 10^{24} metres.

To help compare different orders of magnitude, this section lists distances starting at 1 Ym (10^{24} m or 105.702 million light-years).

- 1.2 Ym – 127 million light-years – distance to the closest observed gamma ray burst GRB 980425
- 1.3 Ym – 137 million light-years – distance to the Centaurus Cluster of galaxies, the nearest large supercluster
- 1.9 Ym – 200 million light-years – distance to the great attractor.
- 1.9 Ym – 201 million light-years – diameter of the Local Supercluster
- 2.17 Ym – 1 light-galactic-years – 230 million light-years
- 2.3 Ym – 225 to 250 million light-years – distance light travels in vacuum in one galactic year
- 2.8 Ym – 296 million light-years – distance to the Coma Cluster
- 3.15 Ym – 330 million light years – diameter of the Boötes Void
- 3.2 Ym – 338 million light-years – distance to Stephan's Quintet
- 4.7 Ym – 496 million light-years – length of the CfA2 Great Wall, one of the largest observed superstructures in the Universe
- 4.7 Ym – 500 million light-years – approximate diameter of the Laniakea supercluster, the supercluster complex that houses the Milky Way.
- 6.1 Ym – 645 million light-years – distance to the Shapley Supercluster
- 9.5 Ym – 996 million light-years – diameter of the Eridanus Supervoid, one of the largest Supervoids.
- 9.5 Ym – 1 billion light-years – one light eon.

== 10 yottametres ==
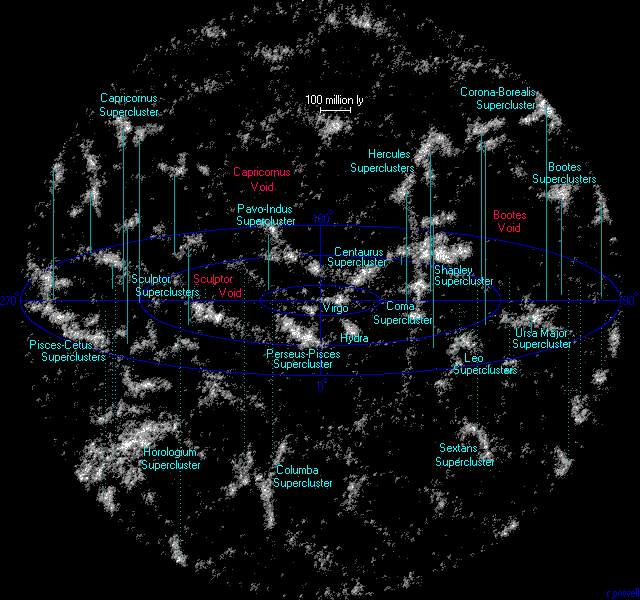
The universe within one billion light-years of Earth

To help compare different orders of magnitude, this section lists distances starting at 10 Ym (10^{25} m or 1.1 billion light-years). At this scale, expansion of the universe becomes significant. Distance of these objects are derived from their measured redshifts, which depends on the cosmological models used.

- 13 Ym – 1.37 billion light-years – length of the South Pole Wall
- 13 Ym – 1.38 billion light-years – length of the Sloan Great Wall
- 18 Ym – redshift 0.16 – 1.9 billion light-years – distance to the quasar 3C 273 (light travel distance)
- 30.8568 Ym – 3.2616 billion light-years – 1 gigaparsec
- 31.2204106 Ym − 3.3 billion light-years − length of the Giant Arc, a large cosmic structure discovered in 2021
- 33 Ym – 3.5 billion light-years – maximum distance of the 2dF Galaxy Redshift Survey (light travel distance)
- 37.8 Ym – 4 billion light-years – length of the Huge-LQG
- 75 Ym – redshift 0.95 – 8 billion light-years – approximate distance to the supernova SN 2002dd in the Hubble Deep Field North (light travel distance)
- 85 Ym – redshift 1.6 – 9 billion light-years – approximate distance to the gamma-ray burst GRB 990123 (light travel distance)
- 94.6 Ym – 10 billion light-years – approximate distance to quasar OQ172
- 94.6 Ym – 10 billion light-years – length of the Hercules–Corona Borealis Great Wall, one of the largest and most massive-known cosmic structures known

== 100 yottametres ==
To help compare different orders of magnitude, this section lists distances starting at 100 Ym (10^{26} m or 11 billion light-years). At this scale, expansion of the universe becomes significant. Distance of these objects are derived from their measured redshifts, which depend on the cosmological models used.

- 124 Ym – redshift 7.54 – 13.1 billion light-years – light travel distance (LTD) to the quasar ULAS J1342+0928, the most distant-known quasar as of 2017
- 130 Ym – redshift 1,000 – 13.8 billion light-years – distance (LTD) to the source of the cosmic microwave background radiation; radius of the observable universe measured as a LTD
- 260 Ym – 27.4 billion light-years – diameter of the observable universe (double LTD)
- 440 Ym – 46 billion light-years – radius of the universe measured as a comoving distance
- 590 Ym – 62 billion light-years – cosmological event horizon: the largest comoving distance from which light will ever reach us (the observer) at any time in the future
- 886.48 Ym – 93.7 billion light-years – the diameter of the observable universe (twice the particle horizon)

== 1 ronnametre ==
The ronnametre (SI symbol: Rm) is a unit of length in the metric system equal to 10^{27} metres.

To help compare different orders of magnitude, this section lists distances starting at 1 Rm (10^{27} m or 105.7 billion light-years). At this scale, expansion of the universe becomes significant. Distance of these objects are derived from their measured redshifts, which depend on the cosmological models used.

- >1 Rm – >105.7 billion light-years – size of universe beyond the cosmic light horizon, depending on its curvature; if the curvature is zero (i.e. the universe is spatially flat), the value can be infinite (see Shape of the universe) as previously mentioned.
- 2.764 Rm - 292.2 billion light-years – circumference of the observable universe, as it is in the shape of a sphere.
- 221.617 Rm - 23.425 trillion light-years - circumference of the observable universe, as it is in the shape of a hypersphere.

== 1 quettametre ==
The quettametre (SI symbol: Qm) is a unit of length in the metric system equal to 10^{30} metres.

== Upper limits ==
- ≈10^{10^{10^{122}}}light-years – the possible size of the universe after cosmological inflation.
- ∞ — size of the universe if it is indeed flat.

== See also ==
- Fermi problem
- Scale (analytical tool)
- Spatial scale
- The Scale of the Universe
- Cosmic Eye
- Cosmic Voyage
- Powers of Ten
- Local (astronomy)
