= Aqaba Flagpole =

Flagpole in Jordan

Coordinates: 29.5217°N 35.0011°E

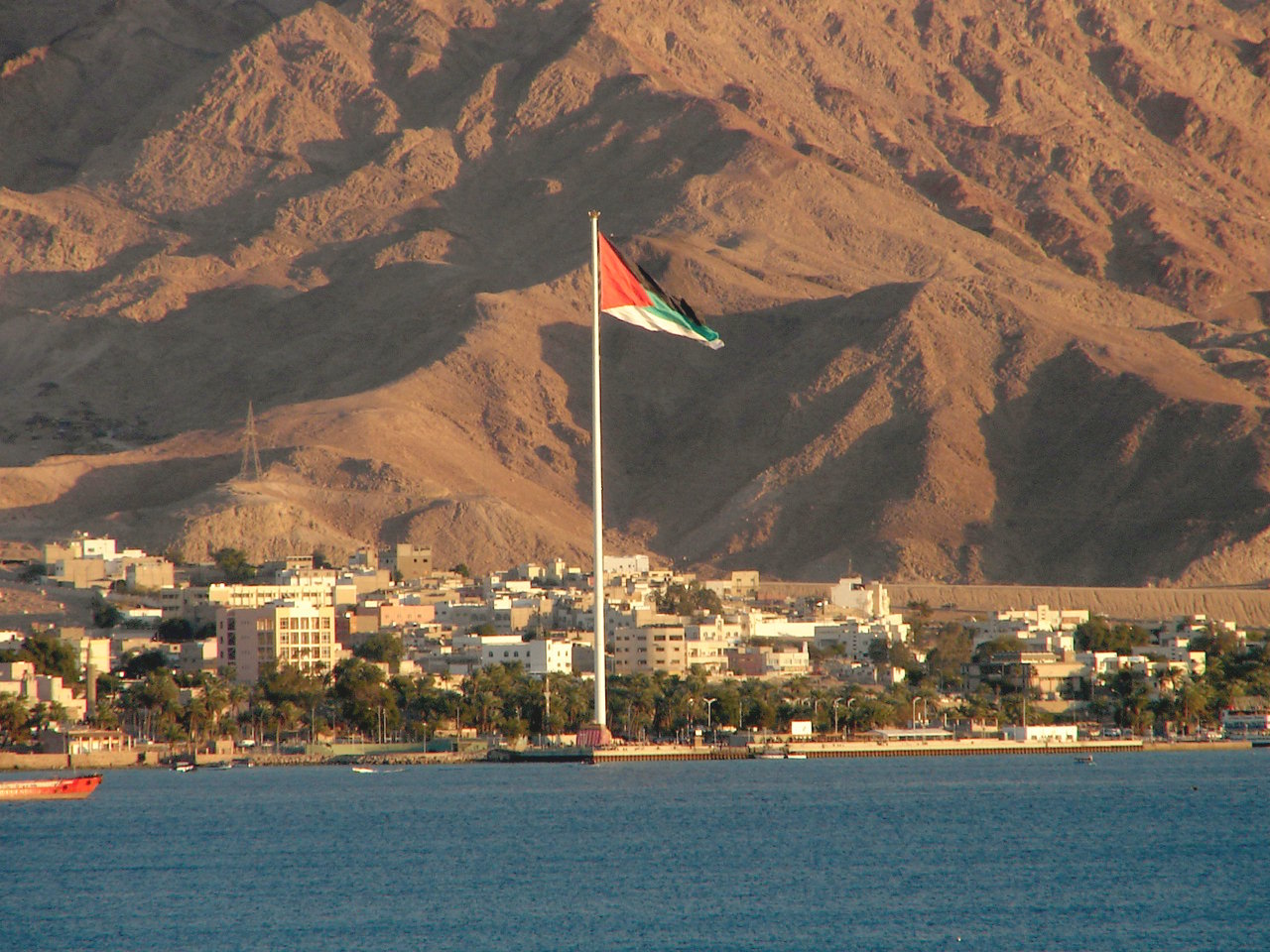
The Aqaba Flagpole in Aqaba, Jordan, as seen from Eilat, Israel, is the tenth-tallest free-standing flagpole in the world.

Flag of the Arab Revolt

The Aqaba Flagpole in Aqaba, Jordan is a 130-metre (430 ft) tall flagpole. This height makes it the tenth tallest free–standing and eleventh tallest flagpole in the world. It was the tallest free–standing flagpole in the world until being surpassed by the 133-metre (436 ft) tall Ashgabat Flagpole in 2008. It carries the flag of the Arab Revolt commemorating the Battle of Aqaba that took place in 1917. The flagpole can be seen from Israel, Egypt, and Saudi Arabia. The flagpole was built in 2004 and opened on 3 October 2004.

== Information ==
=== Technical data ===
Pole height: 130 meters (427 feet)

Pole weight: 344,000 pounds (156 tonnes)

Number of pole sections: 11

Bottom of pole diameter: 103 inches (2.6 metres)

Top of pole diameter: 42 inches (1.1 metres)

Bottom section plate thickness: 1.26 inches – Fy = 50 ksi

Top section plate thickness: .394 inches – Fy = 36 ksi

Maximum section length: 39 feet (12 m)

Mating flanges thicknesses: Minimum: 1.58 inches, maximum 1.97 inches (50 mm)

Flange bolts maximum diameter: 3 inches

Bolt material: A354, Fy = 115 ksi

Foundation: 56 feet (17 m) square by 8.50 feet (2.59 m) deep, 990 cubic yards concrete

=== Design criteria ===
Flag size: 98.5 feet (30.0 m) by 197 feet (60 m)

Flag material: Polyester

Wind speed criteria: (pole and flag) - 90 mph (140 km/h)

Wind speed criteria: (pole only) - 130 mph (210 km/h)

Seismic zone: 4 (Uniform Building Code)

Near seismic source: Less than 2 km (Aqaba Rift)

=== Codes ===
ANSI/NAAMFP-1001-97 – Guide Specification for Design Loads of Metal Flagpoles

Structural engineer of record: Neil Moore and Associates

Builder: Trident Support Corp. with assistance from US Flag and Flagpole Supply LP Contractor : Sahara contracting corporation, Amman, Jordan

== gallery ==
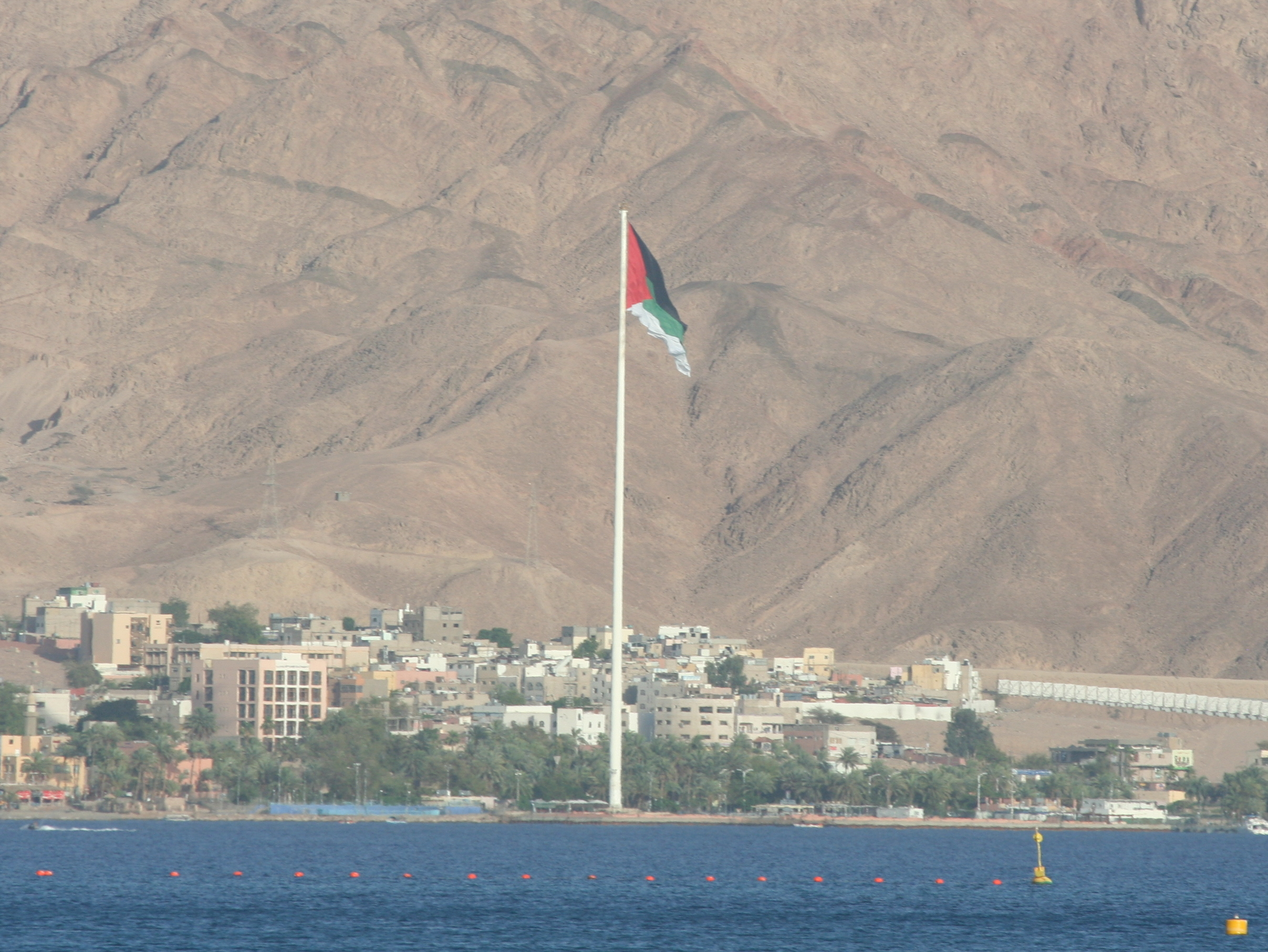

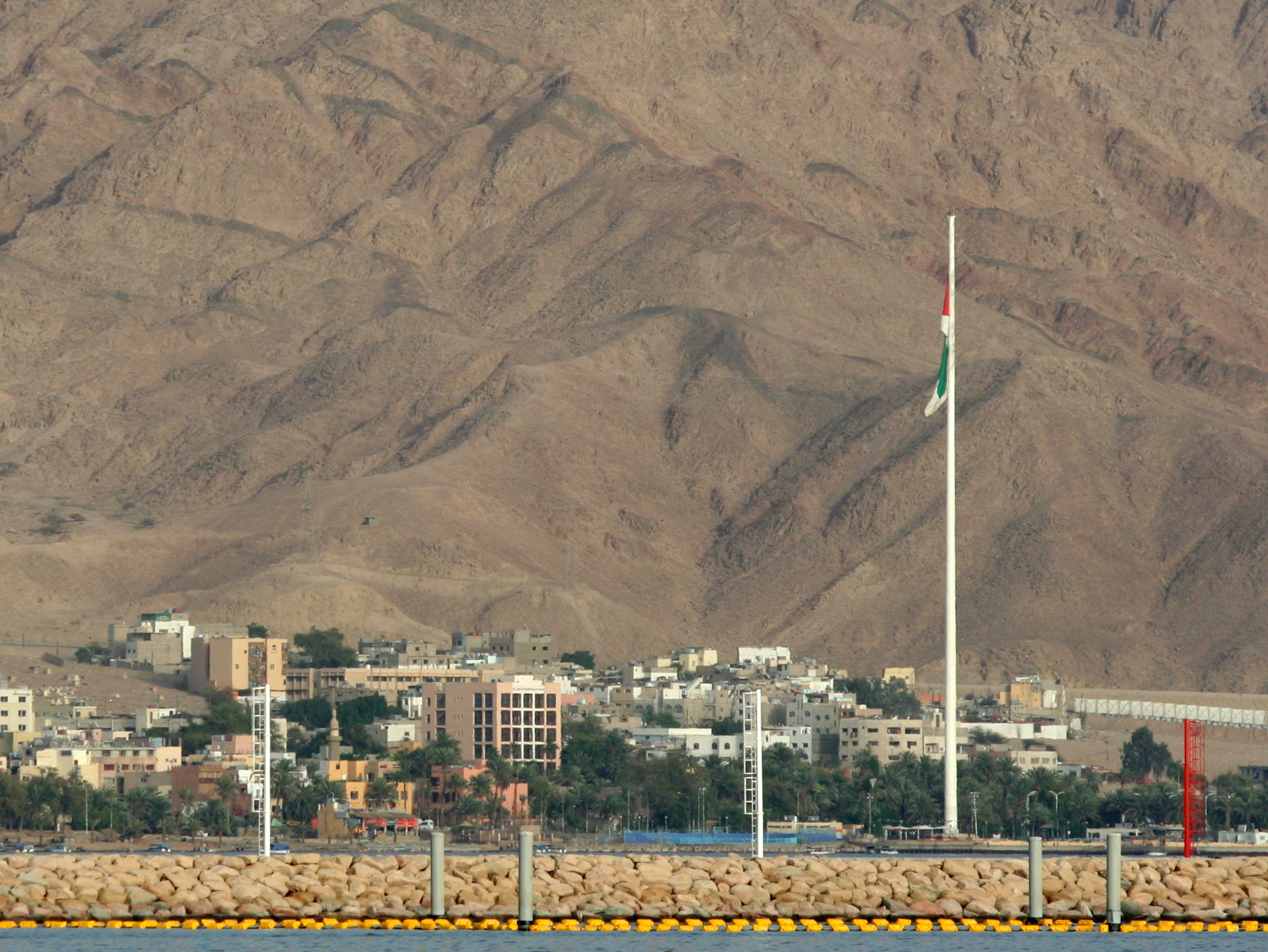

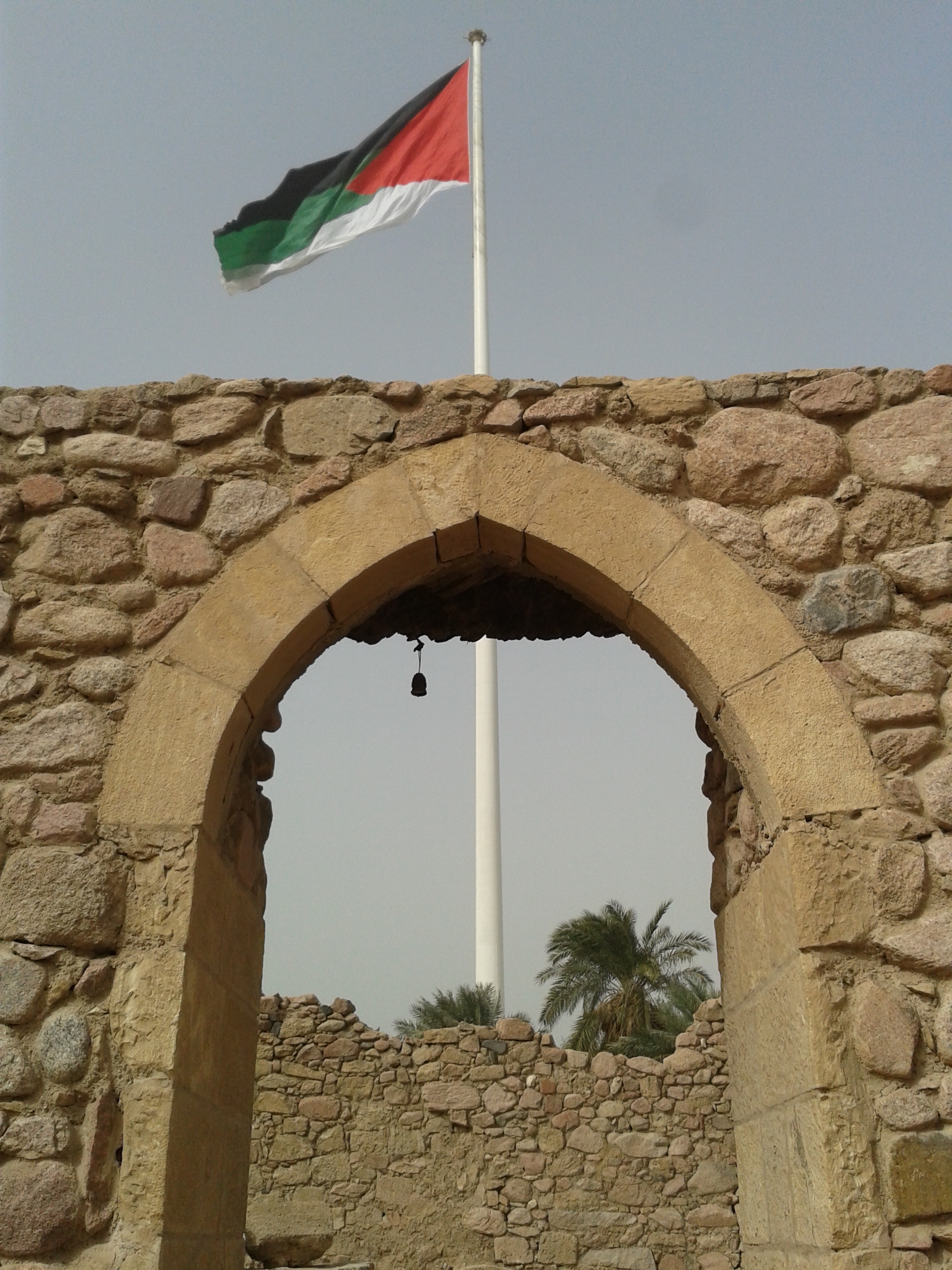

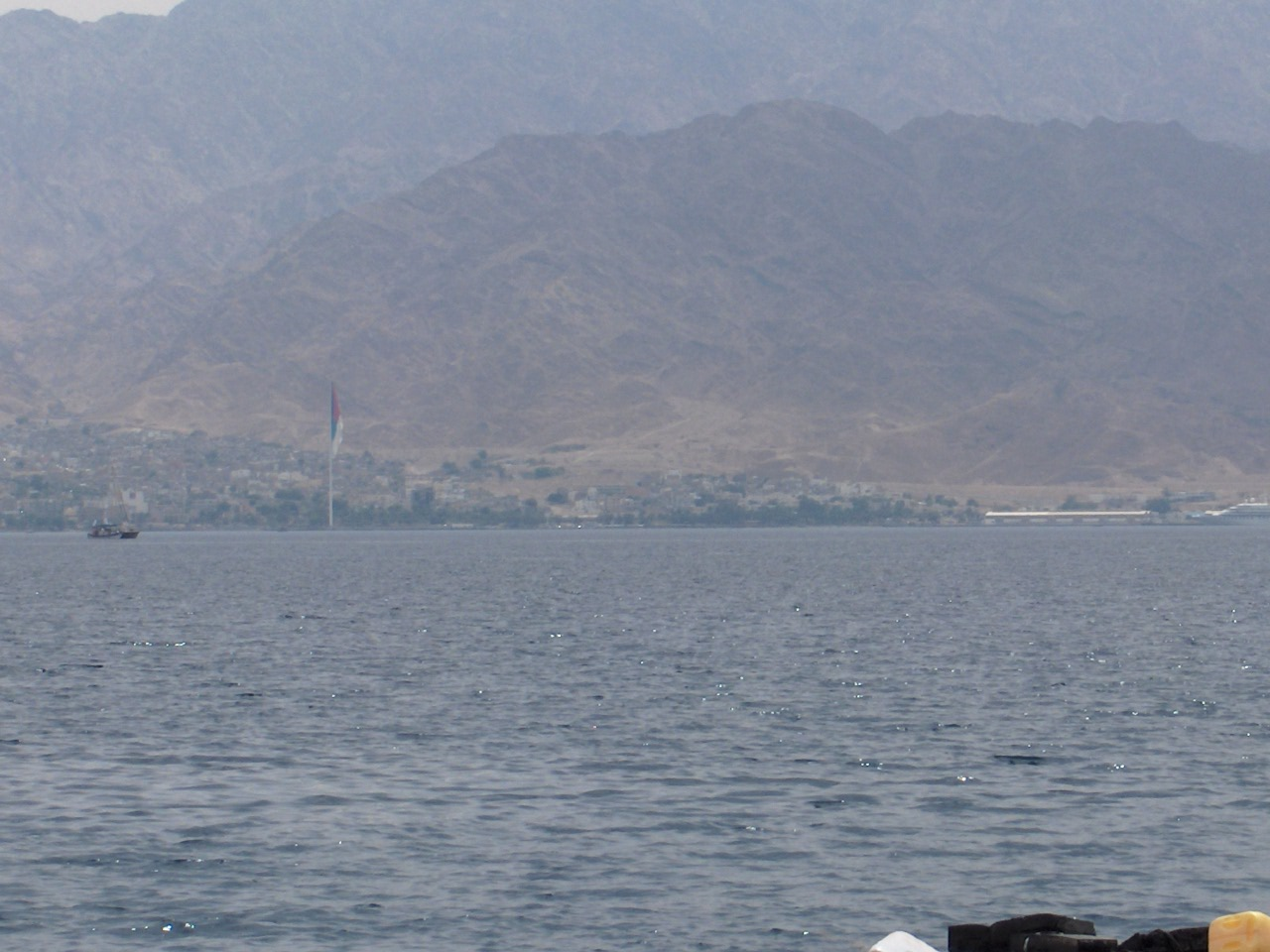

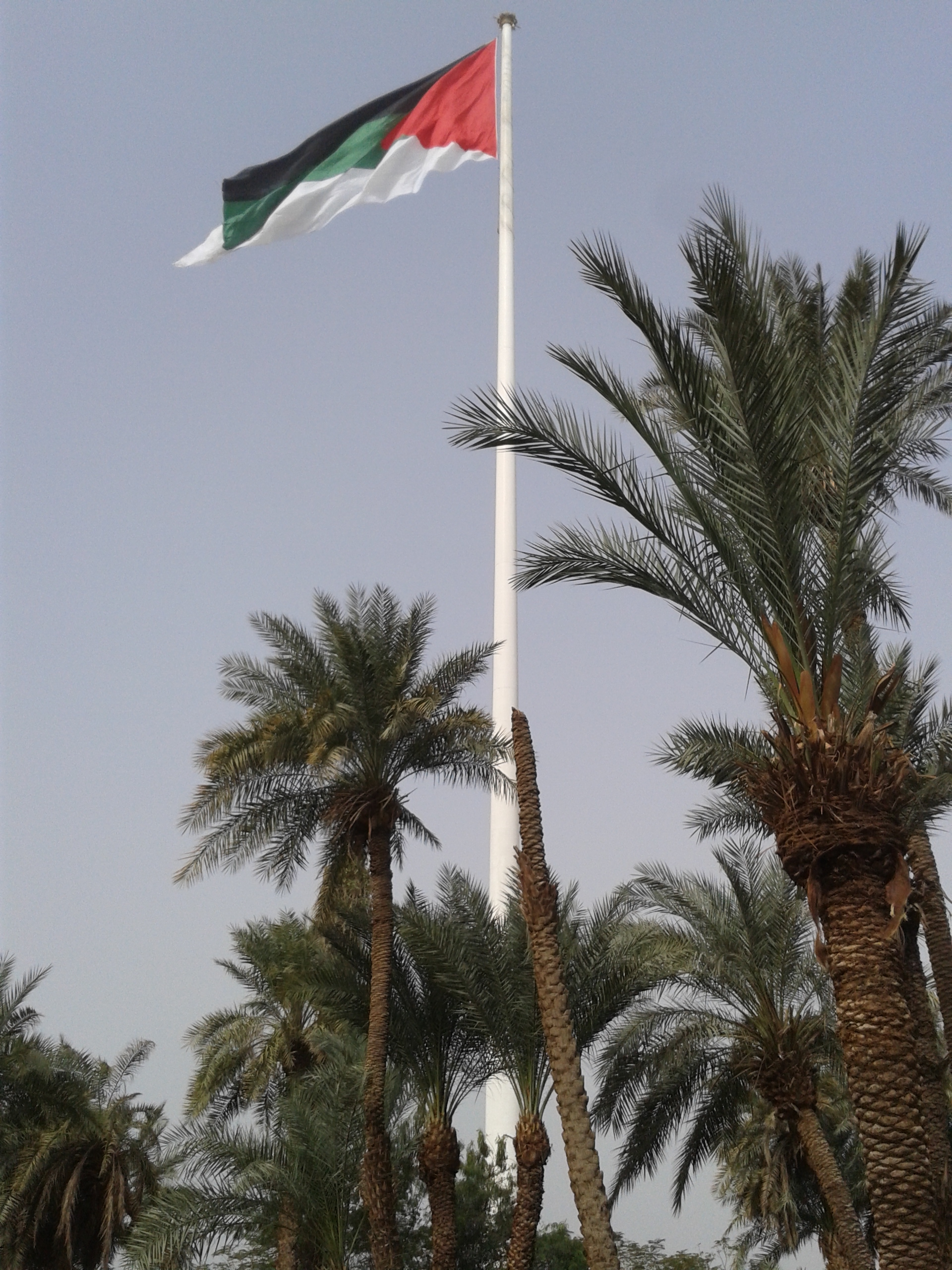

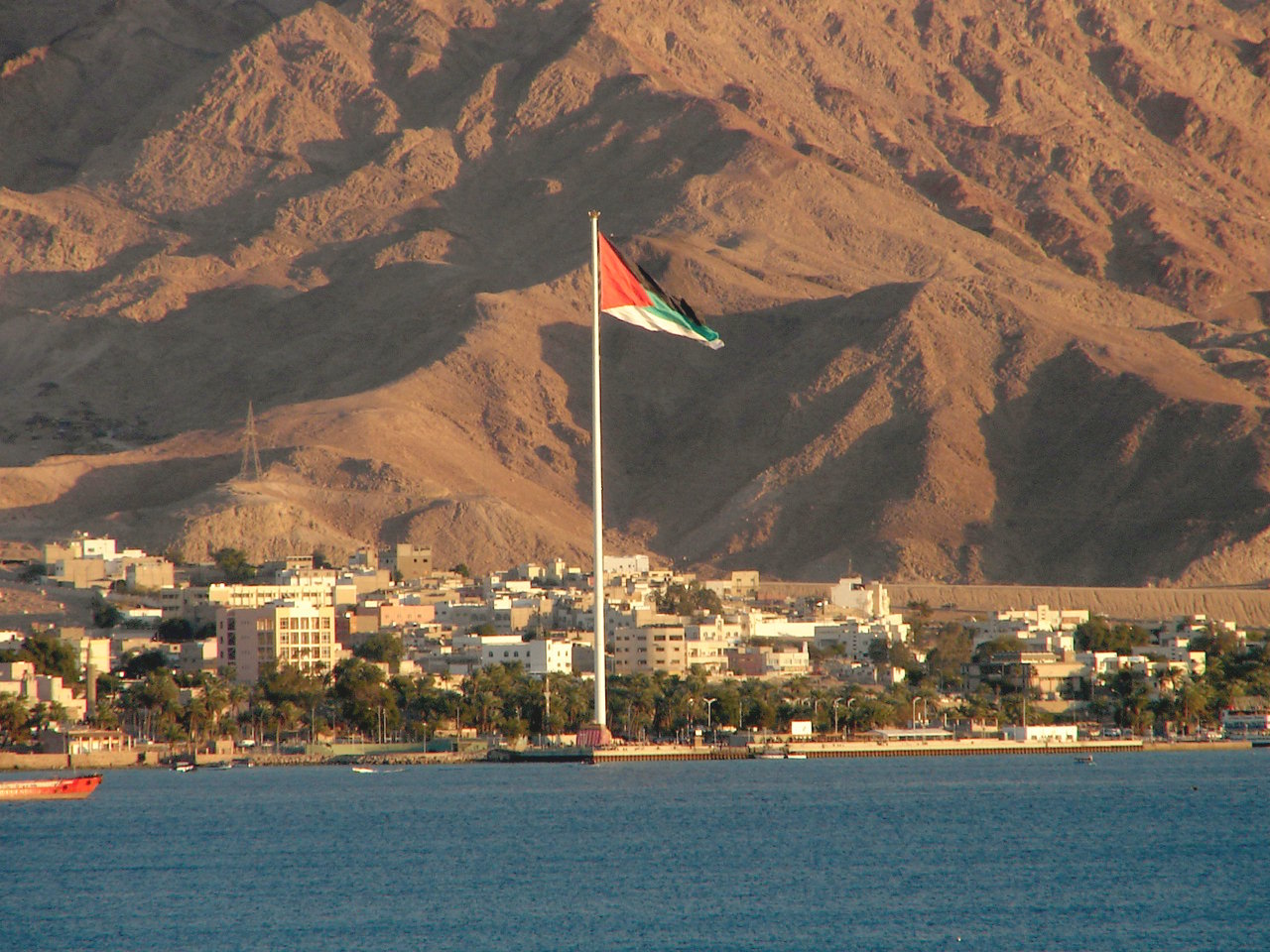

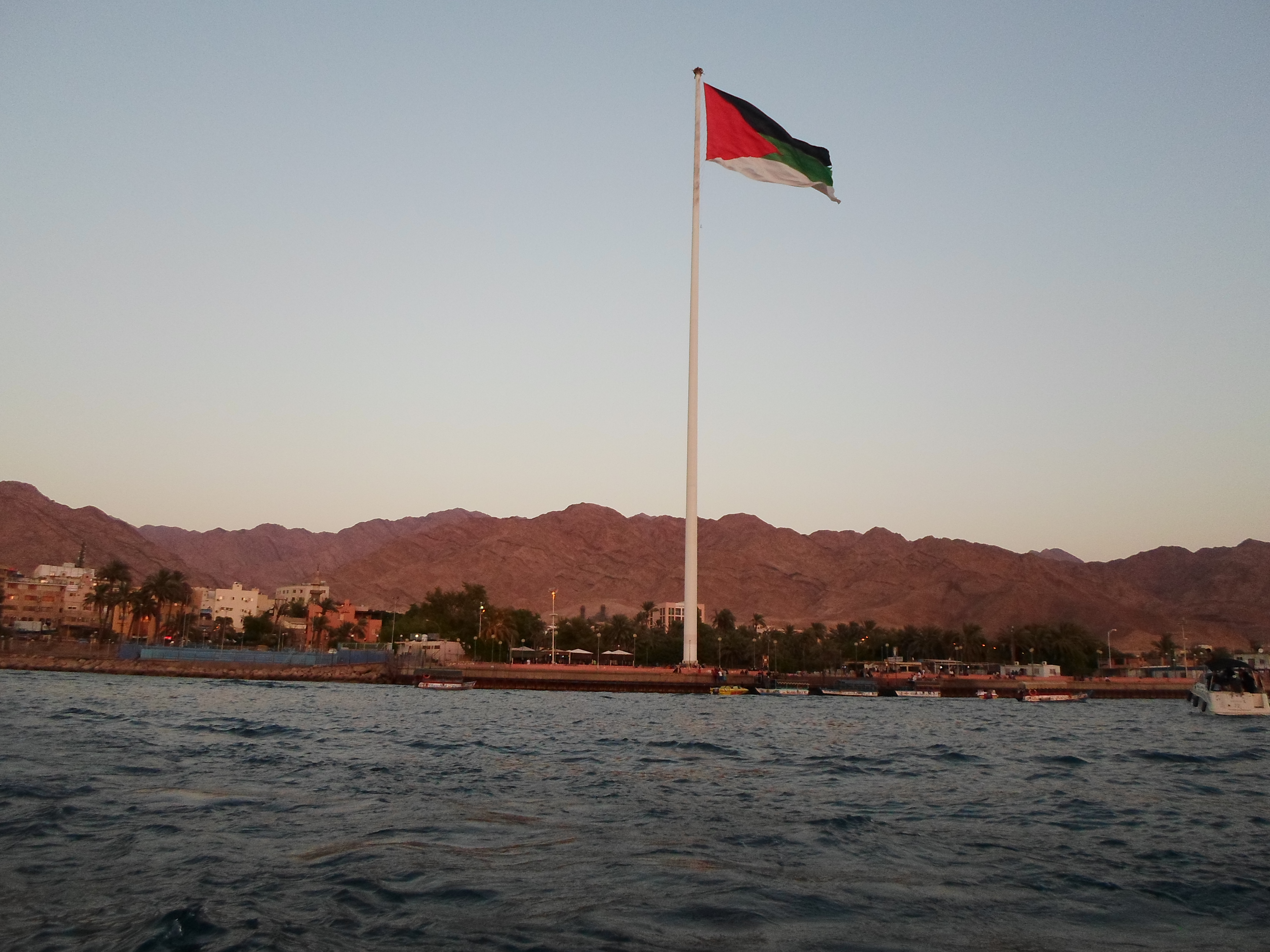

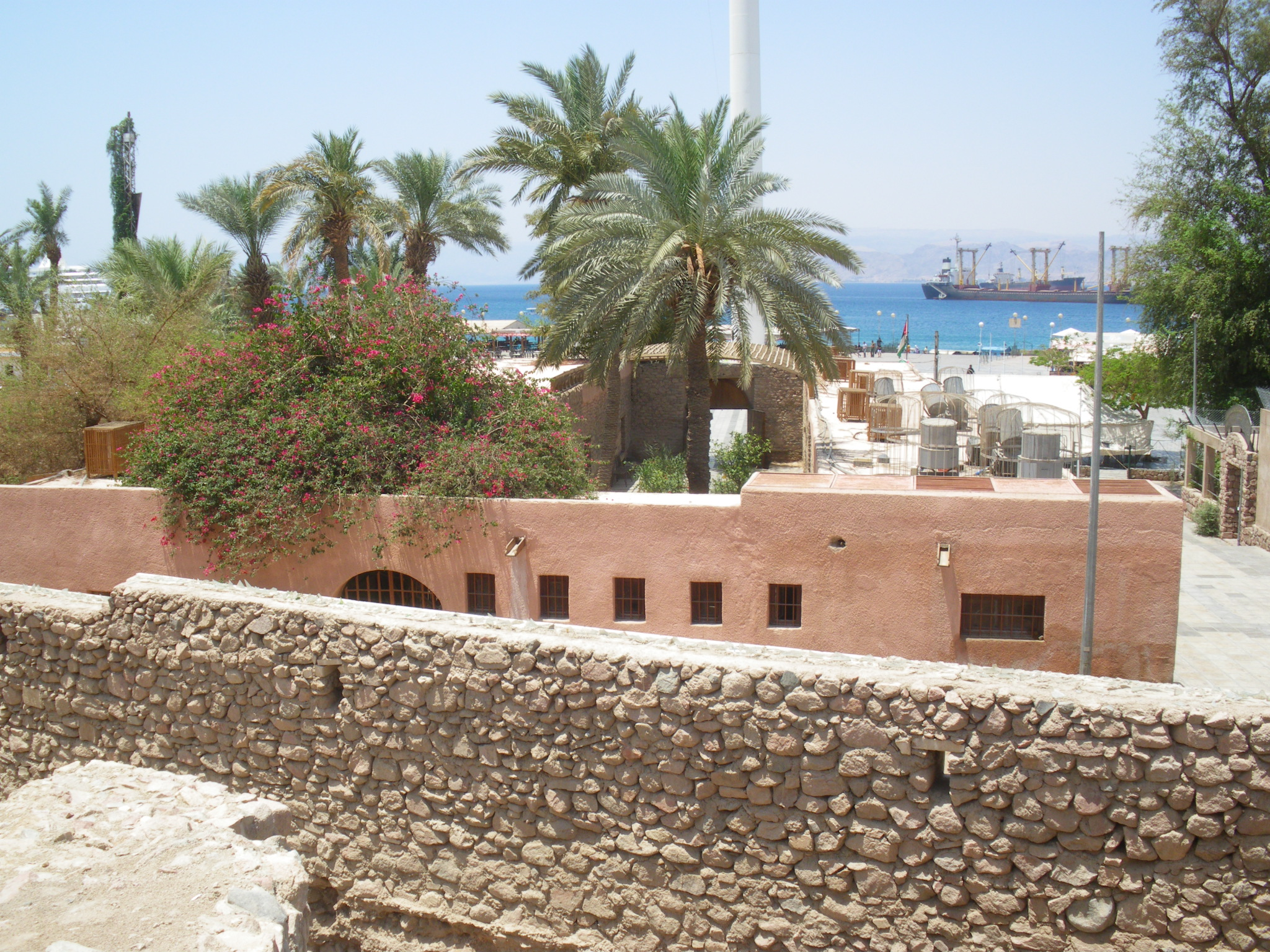

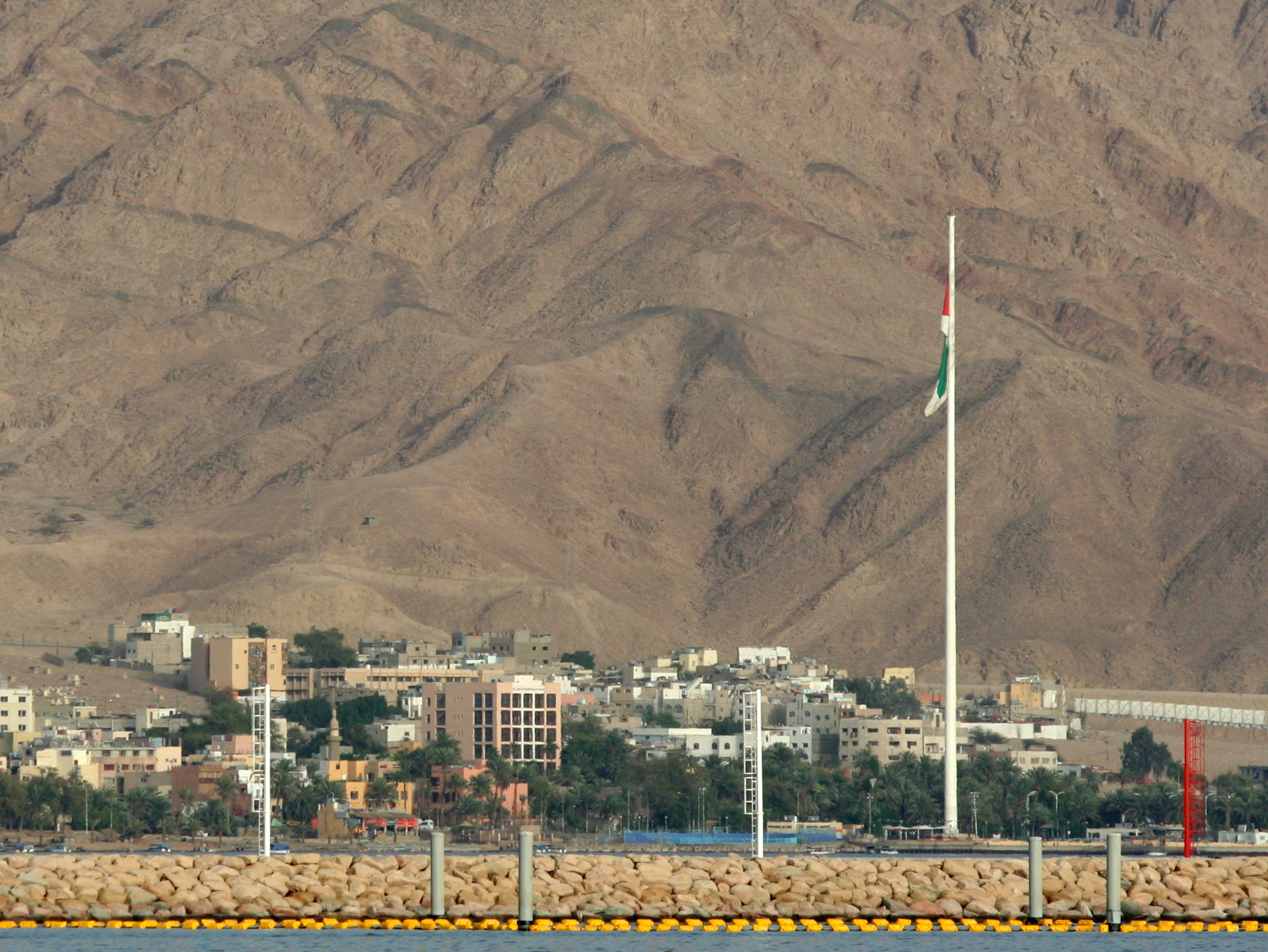

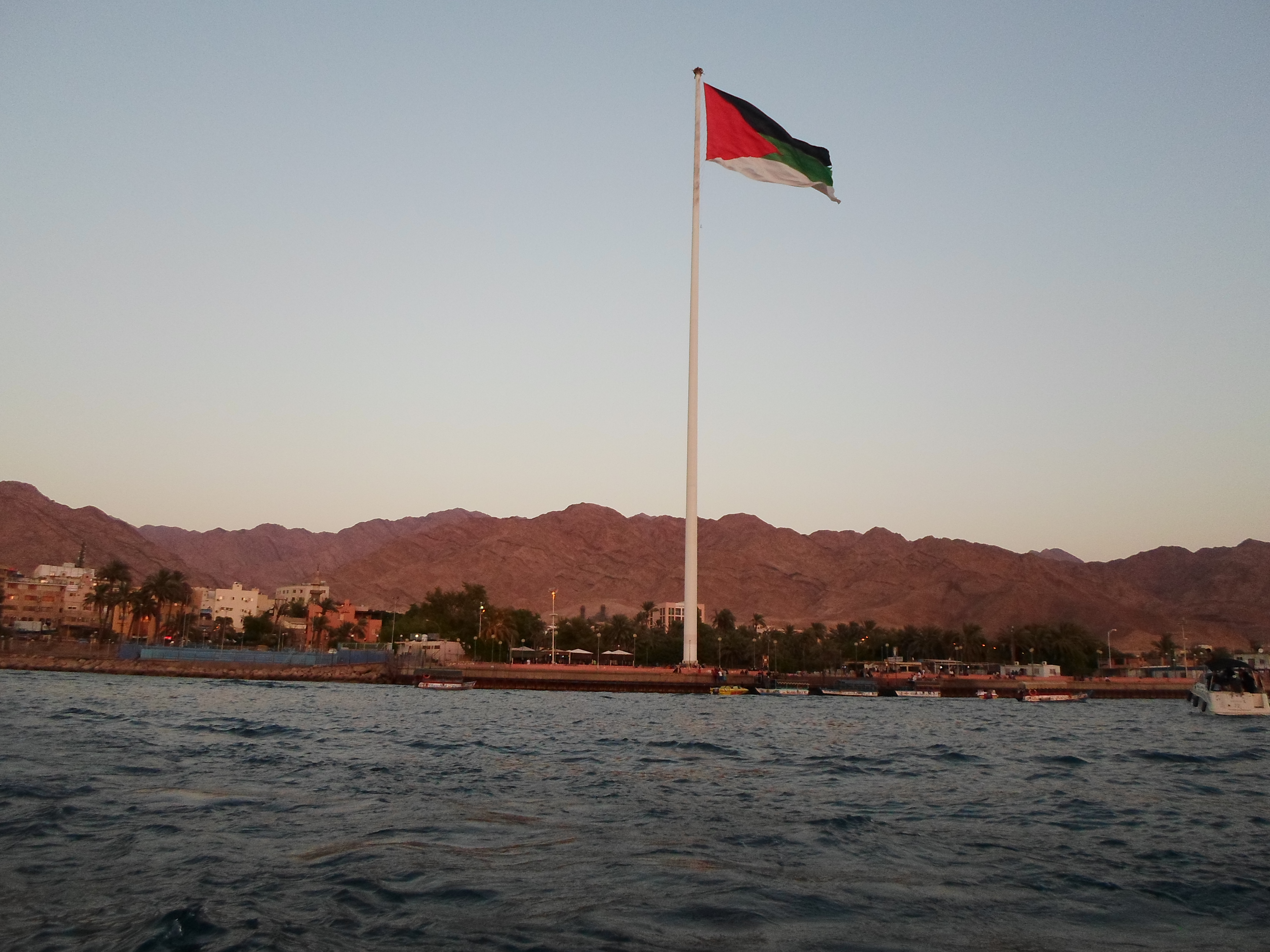
السارية من البحر

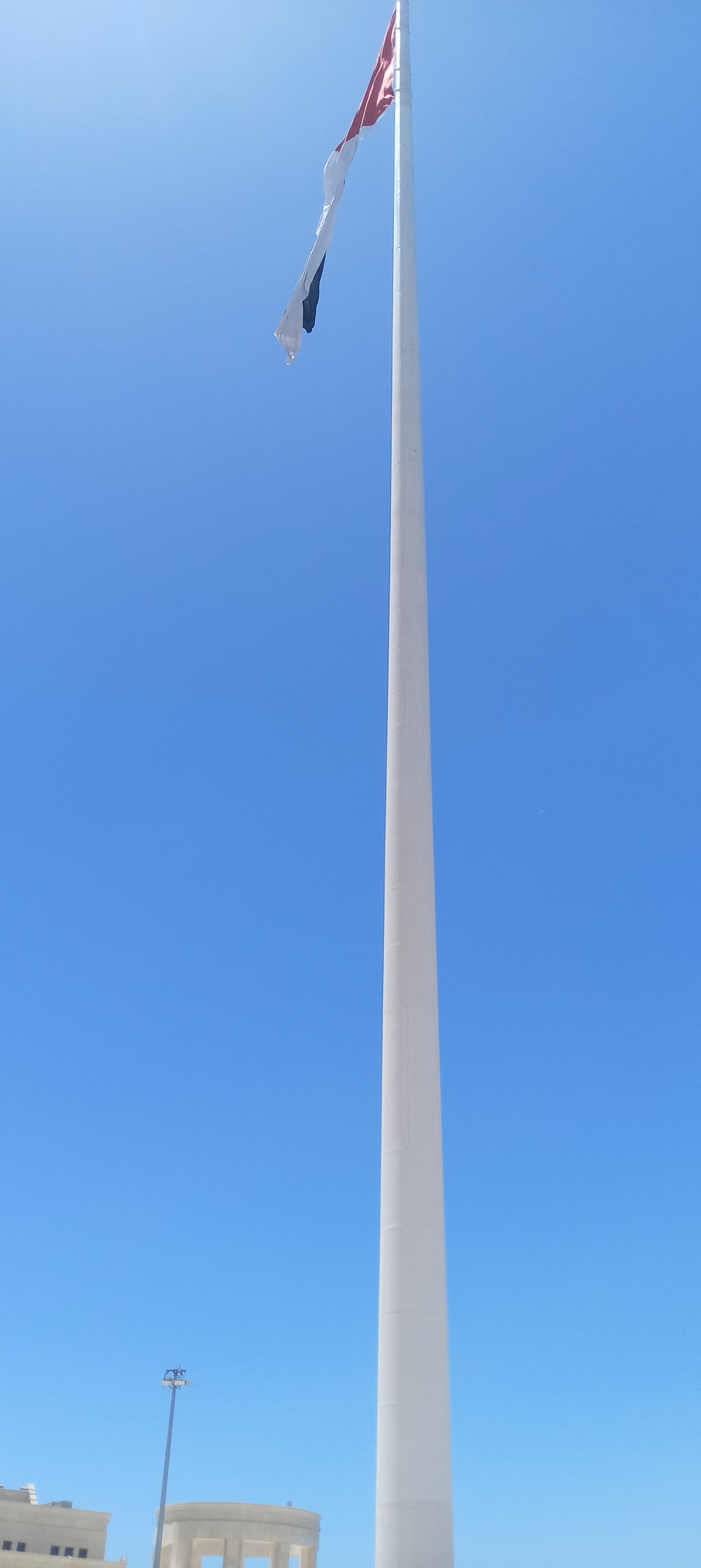

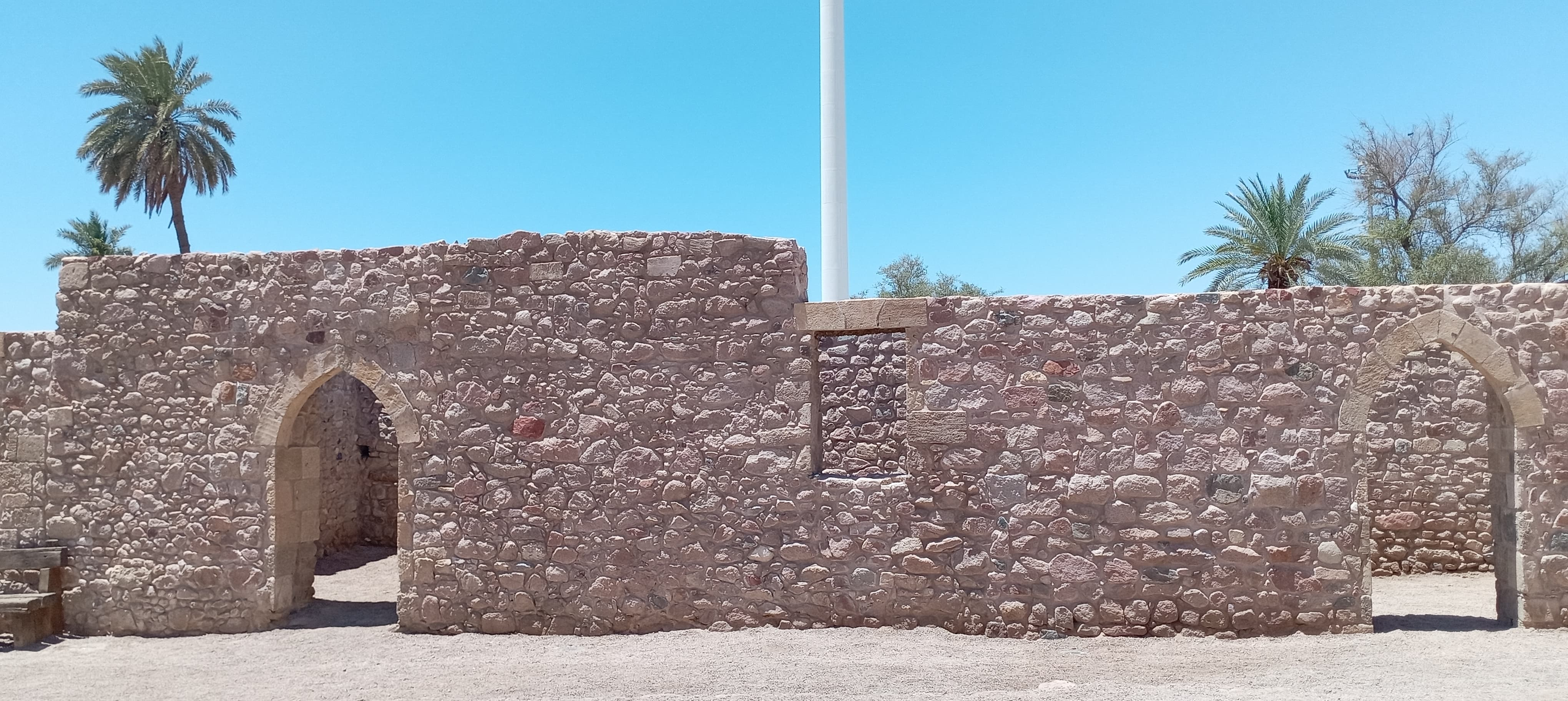
السارية من جاتب قلعة العقبة

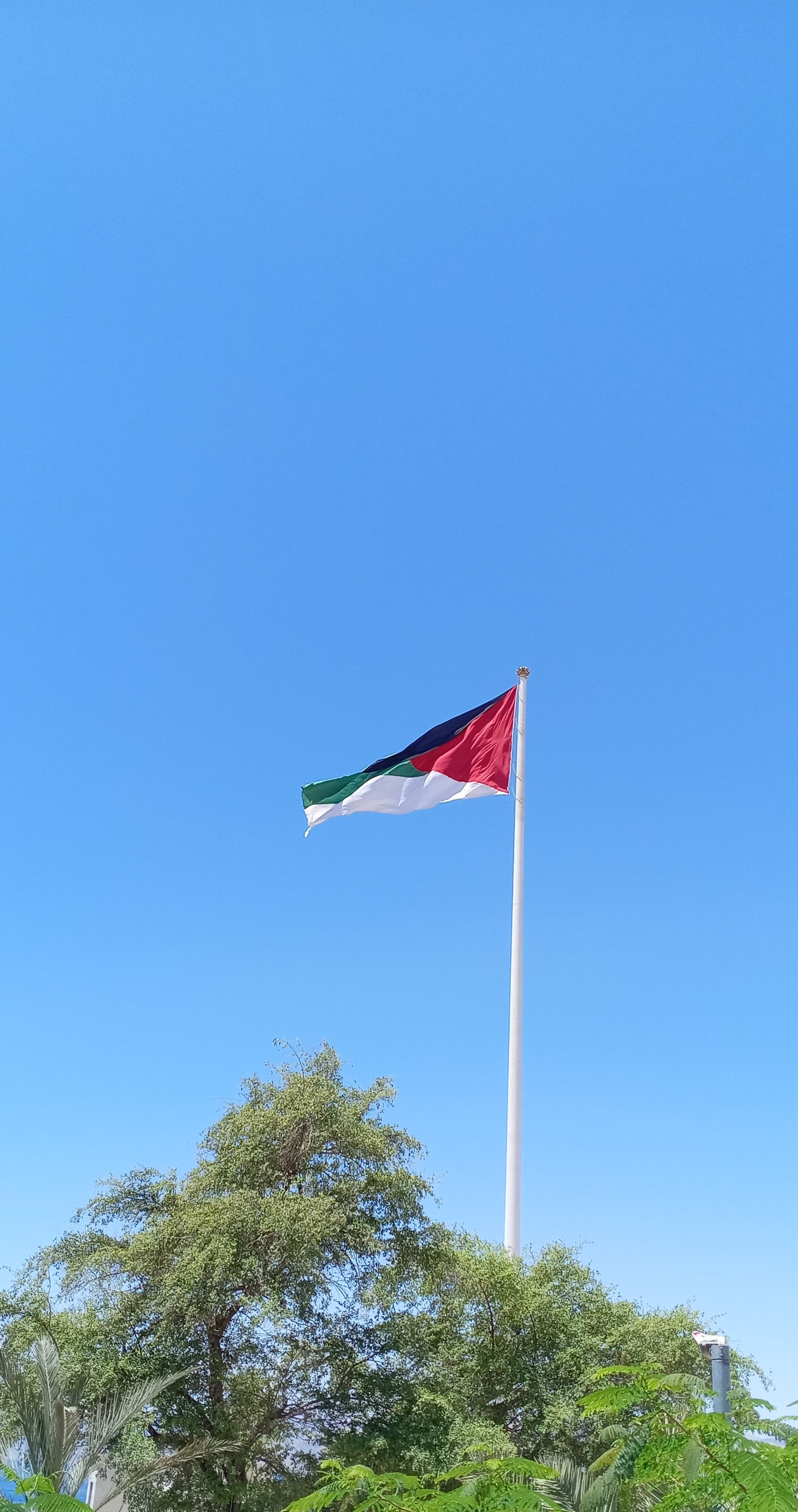

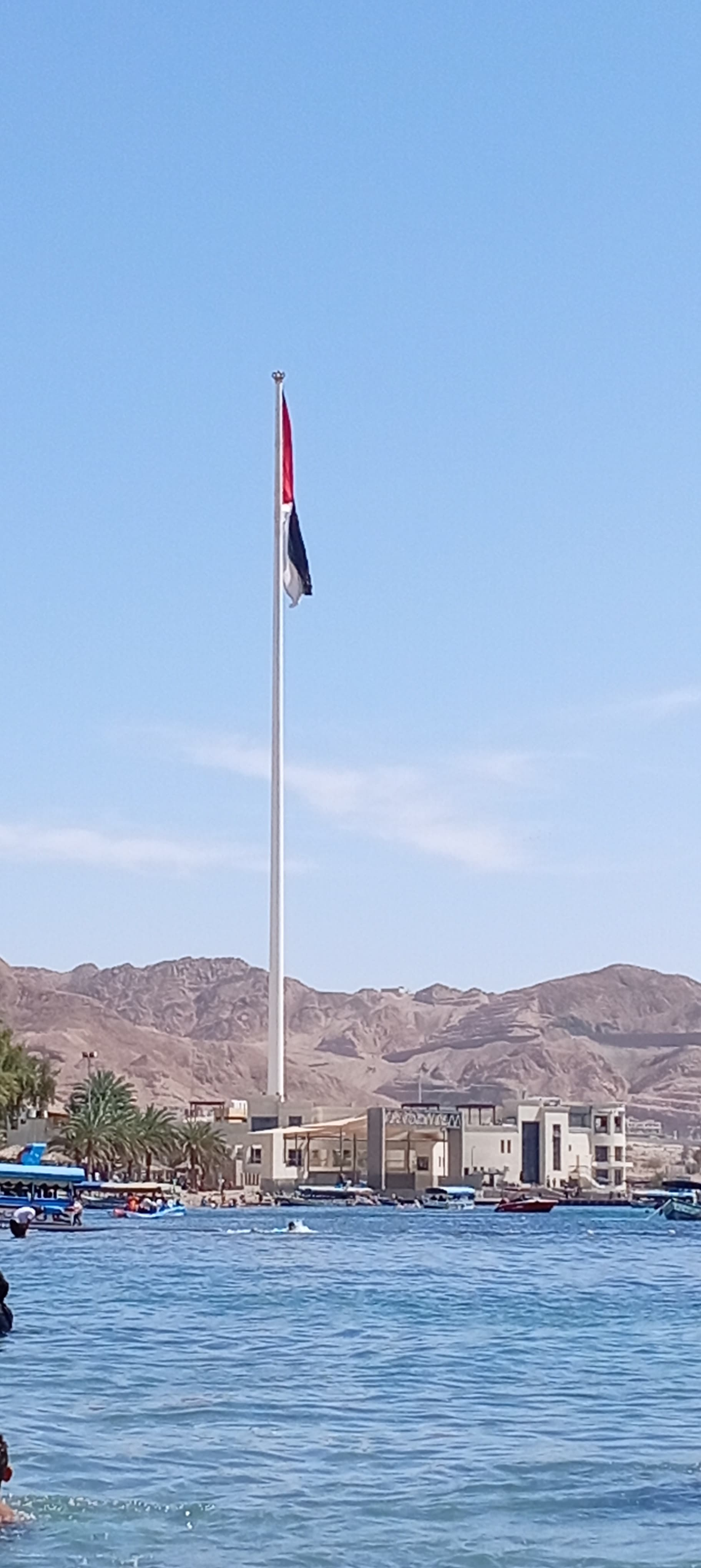

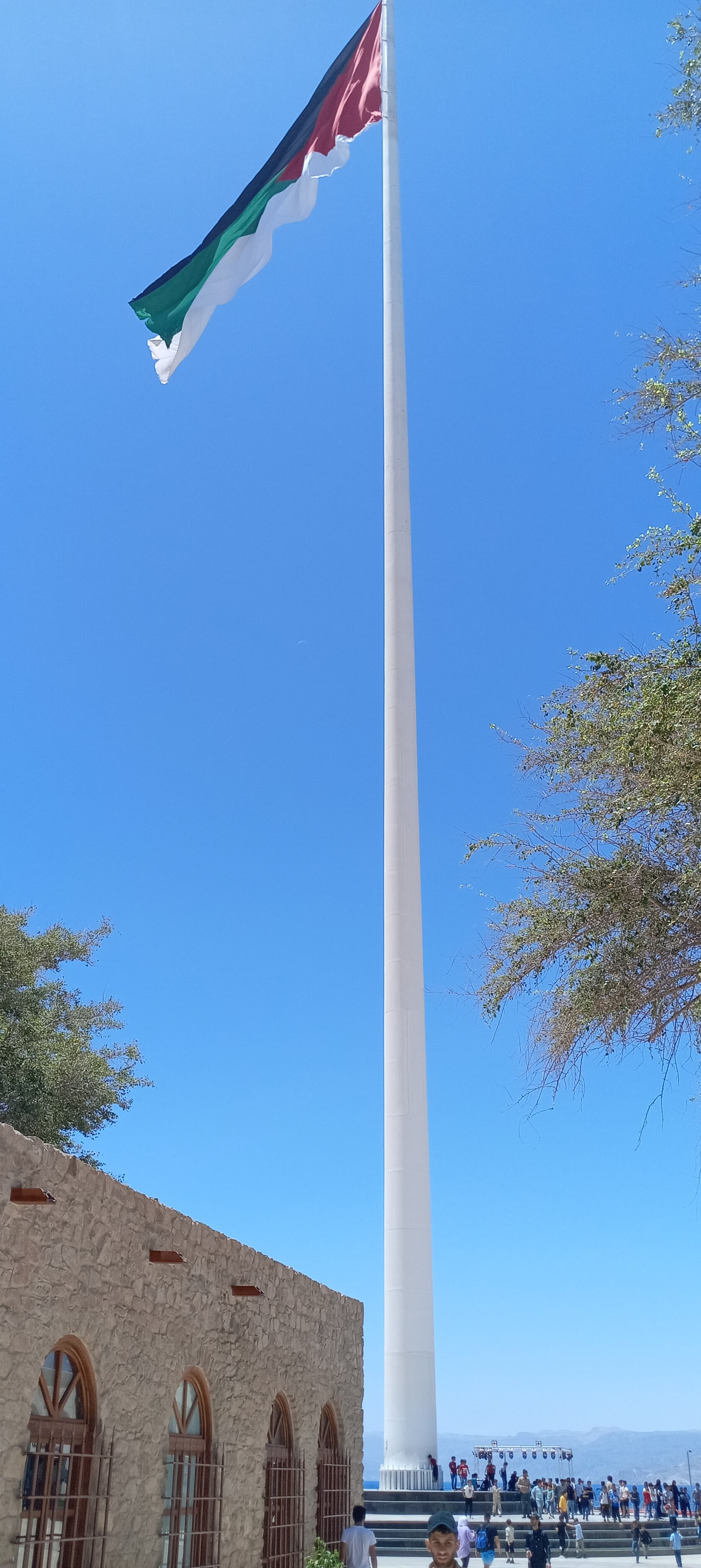

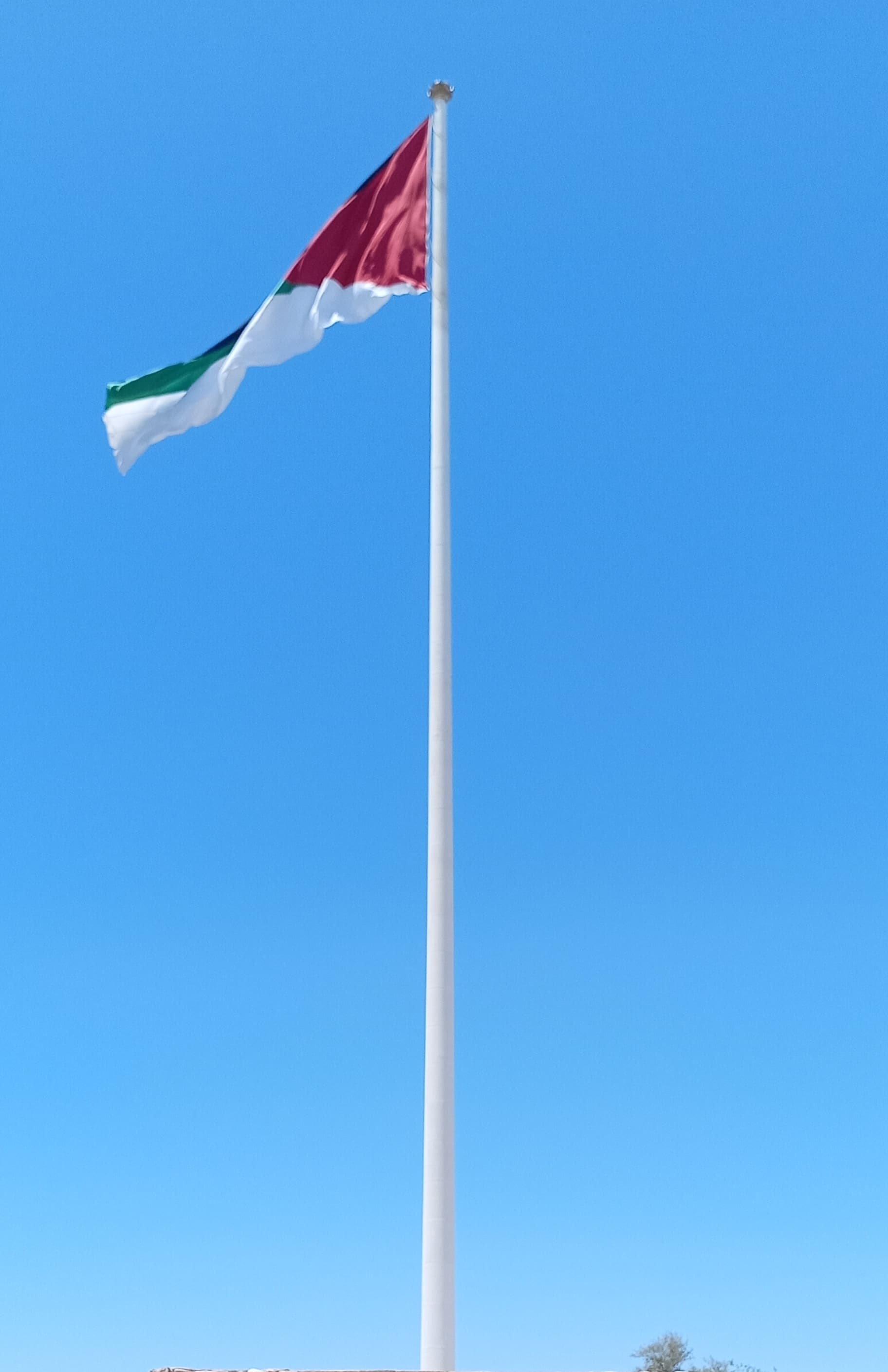

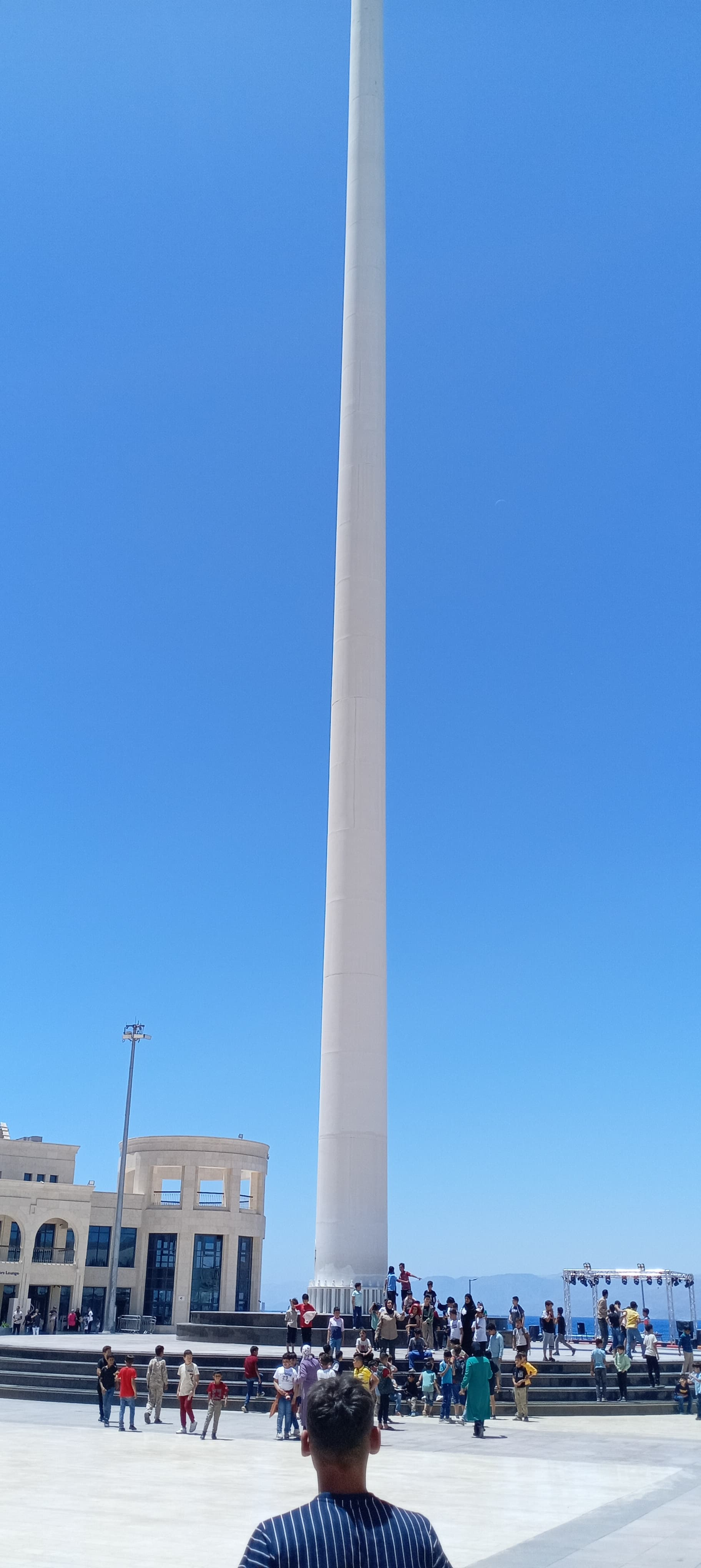
قاعدة السارية

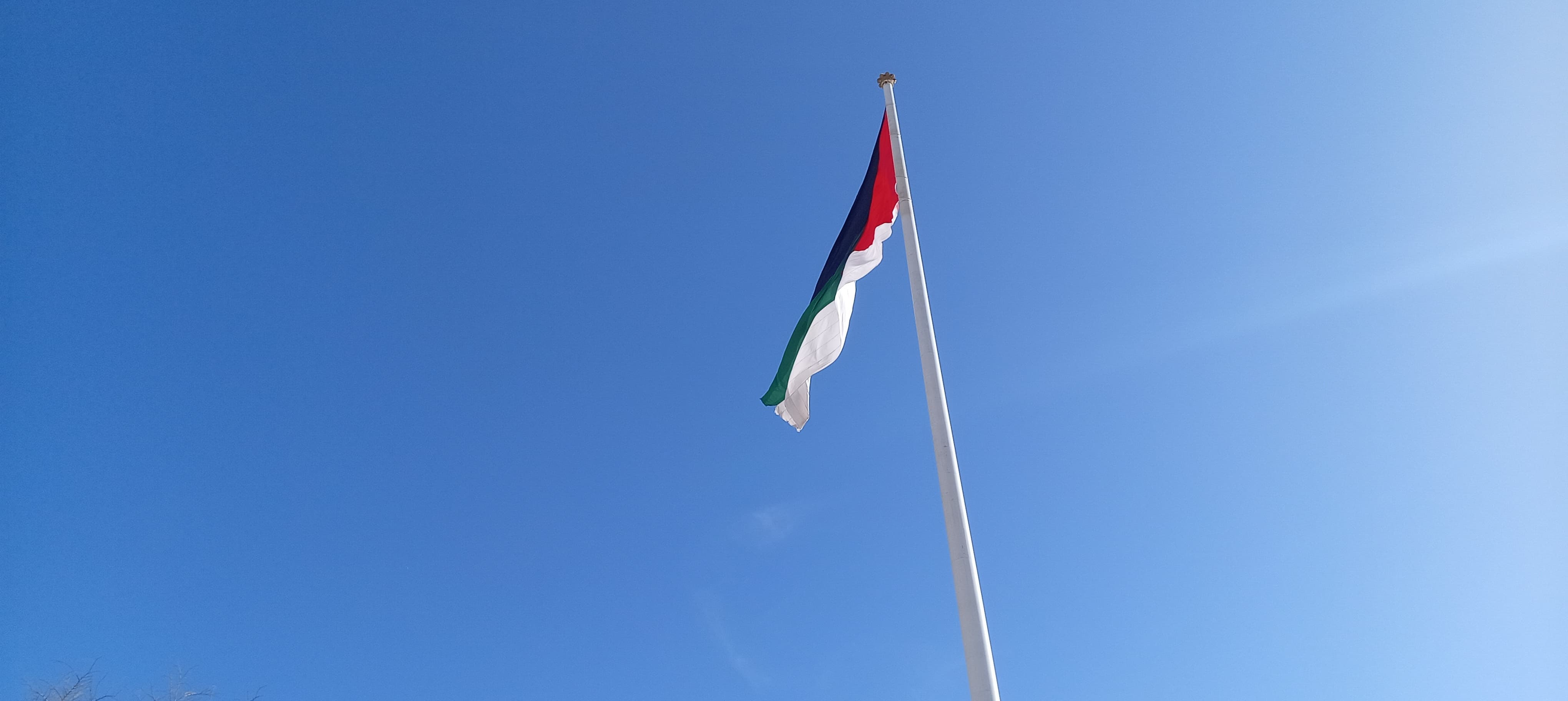

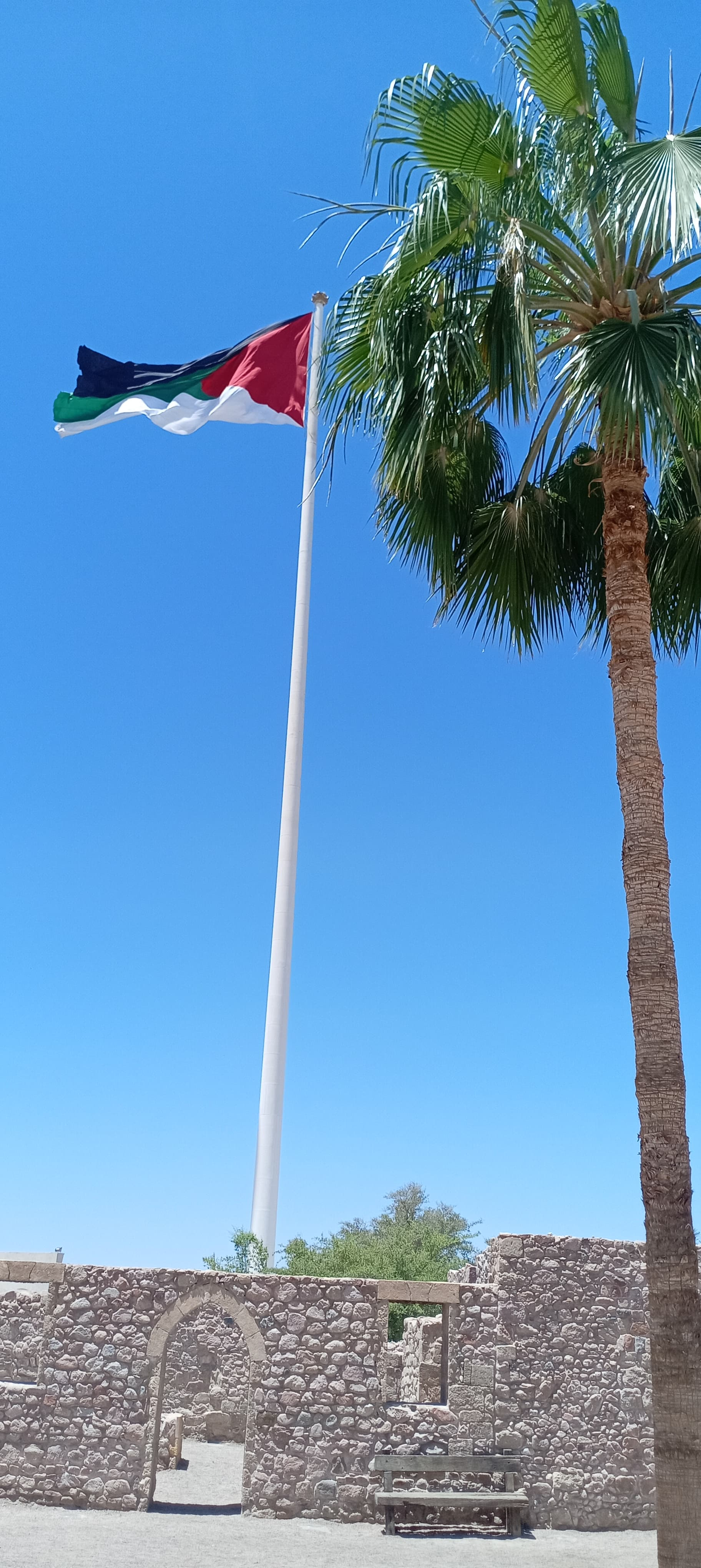

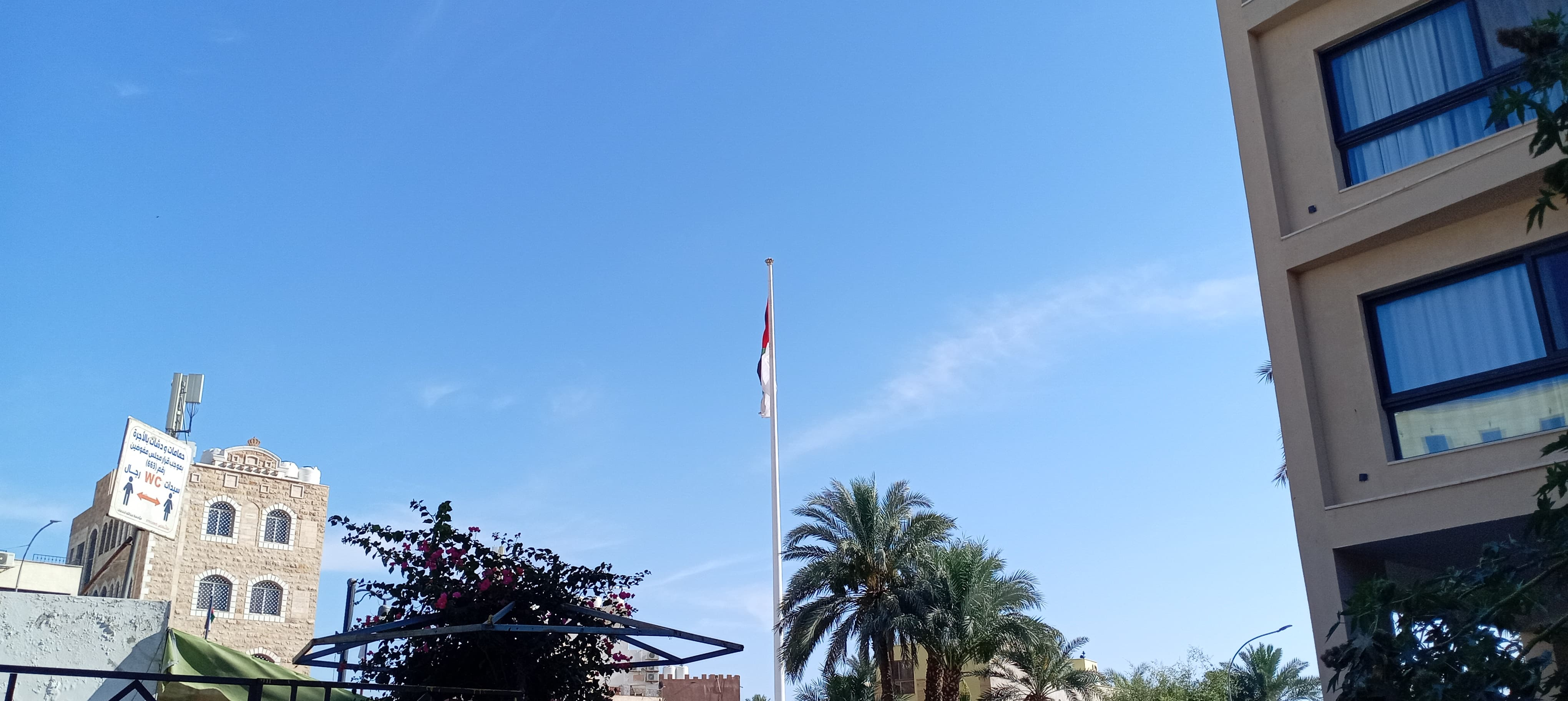

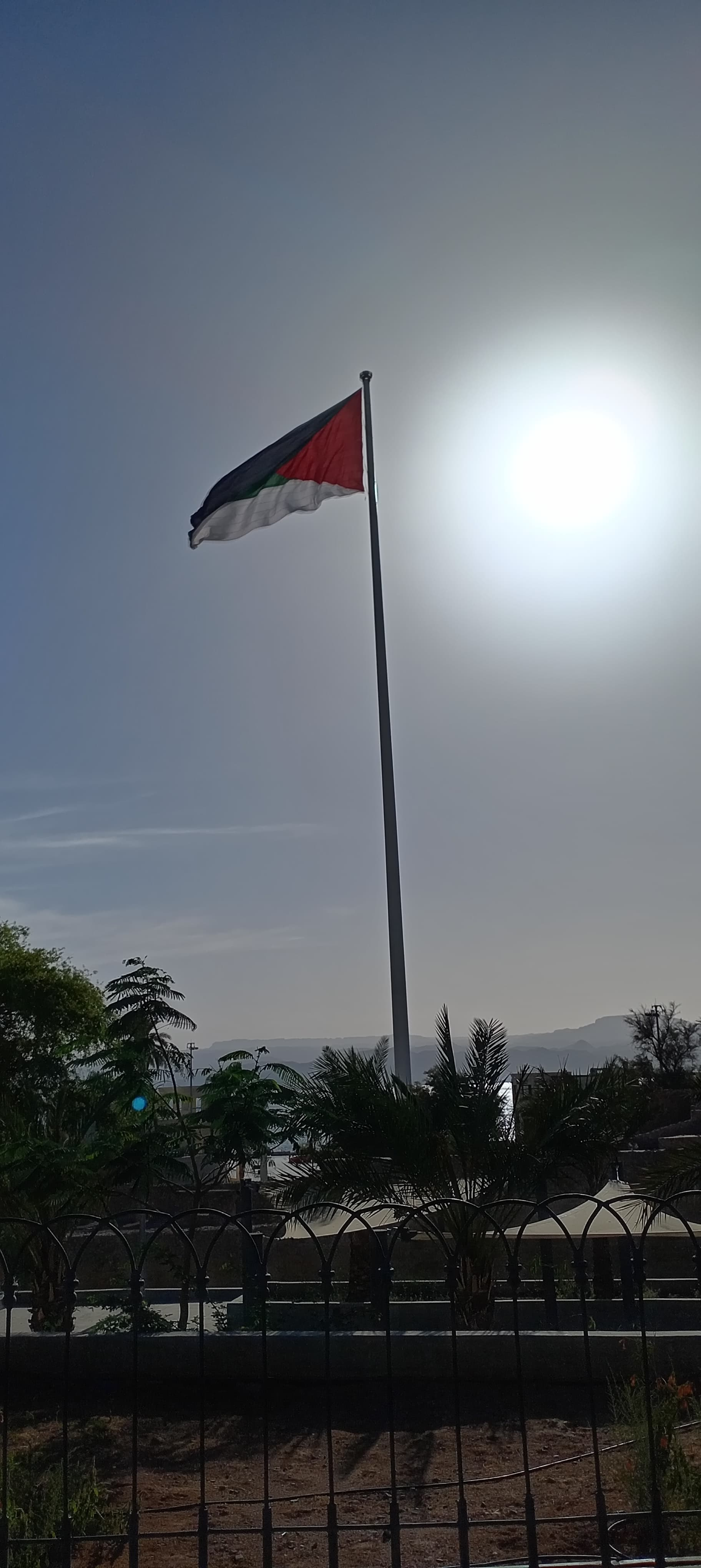

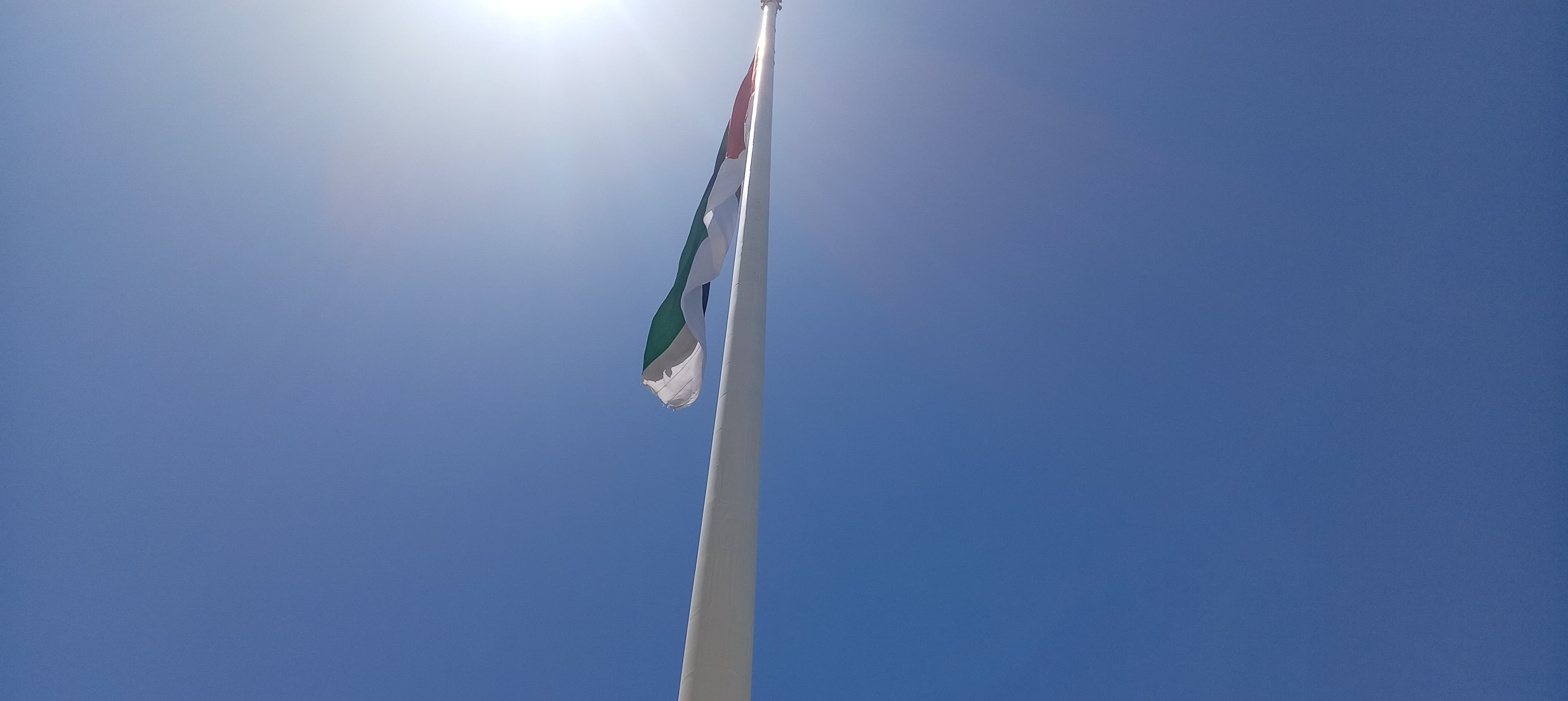

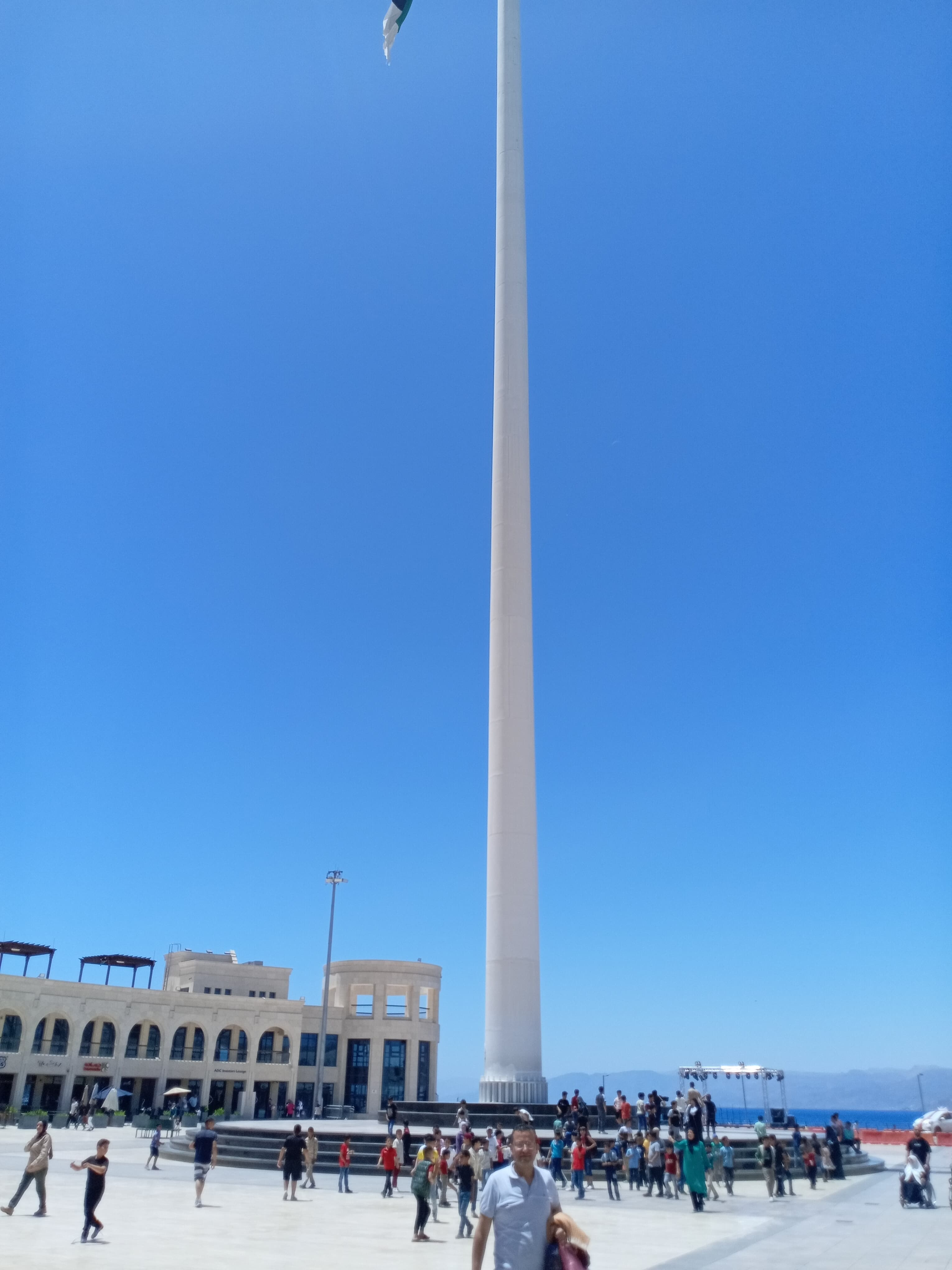

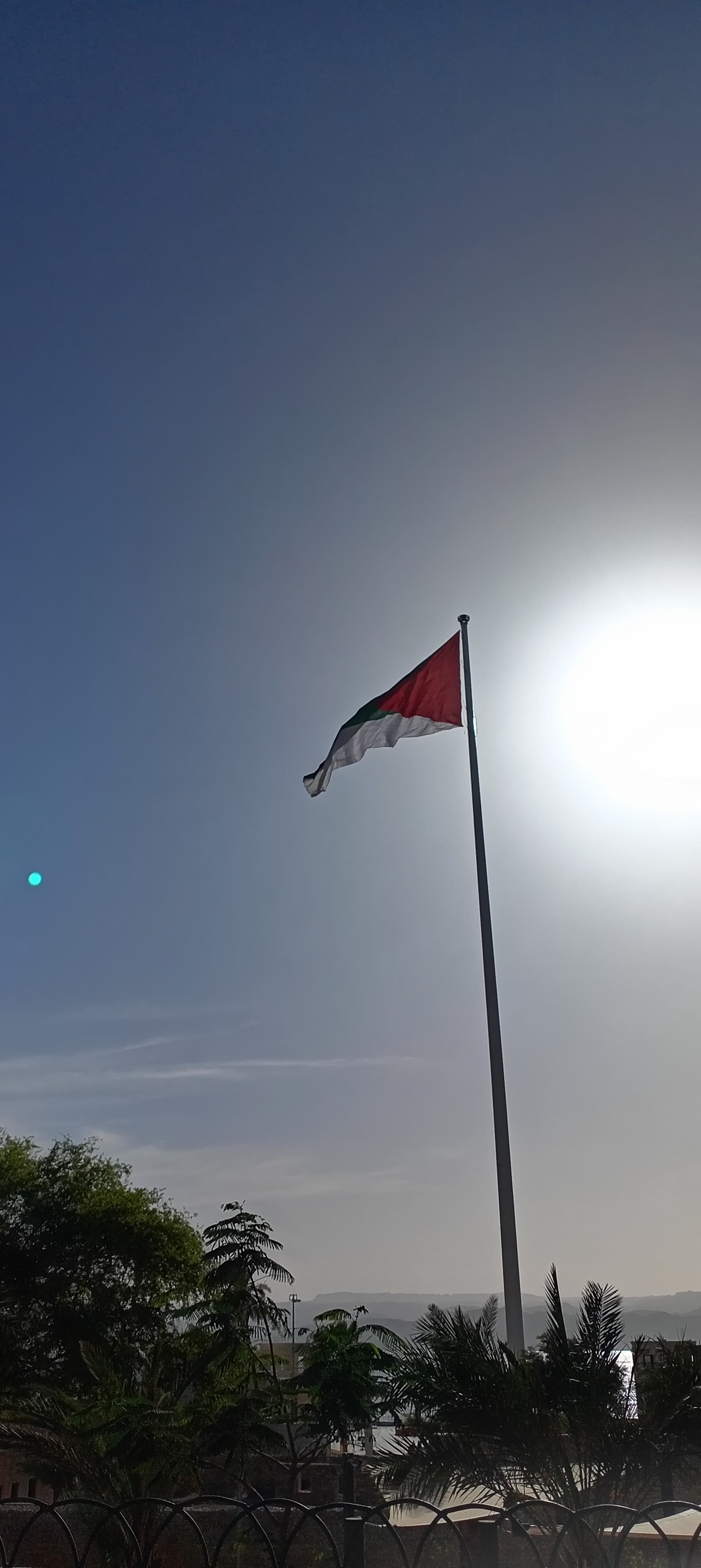
