= Flagpole =

Pole for supporting a flag

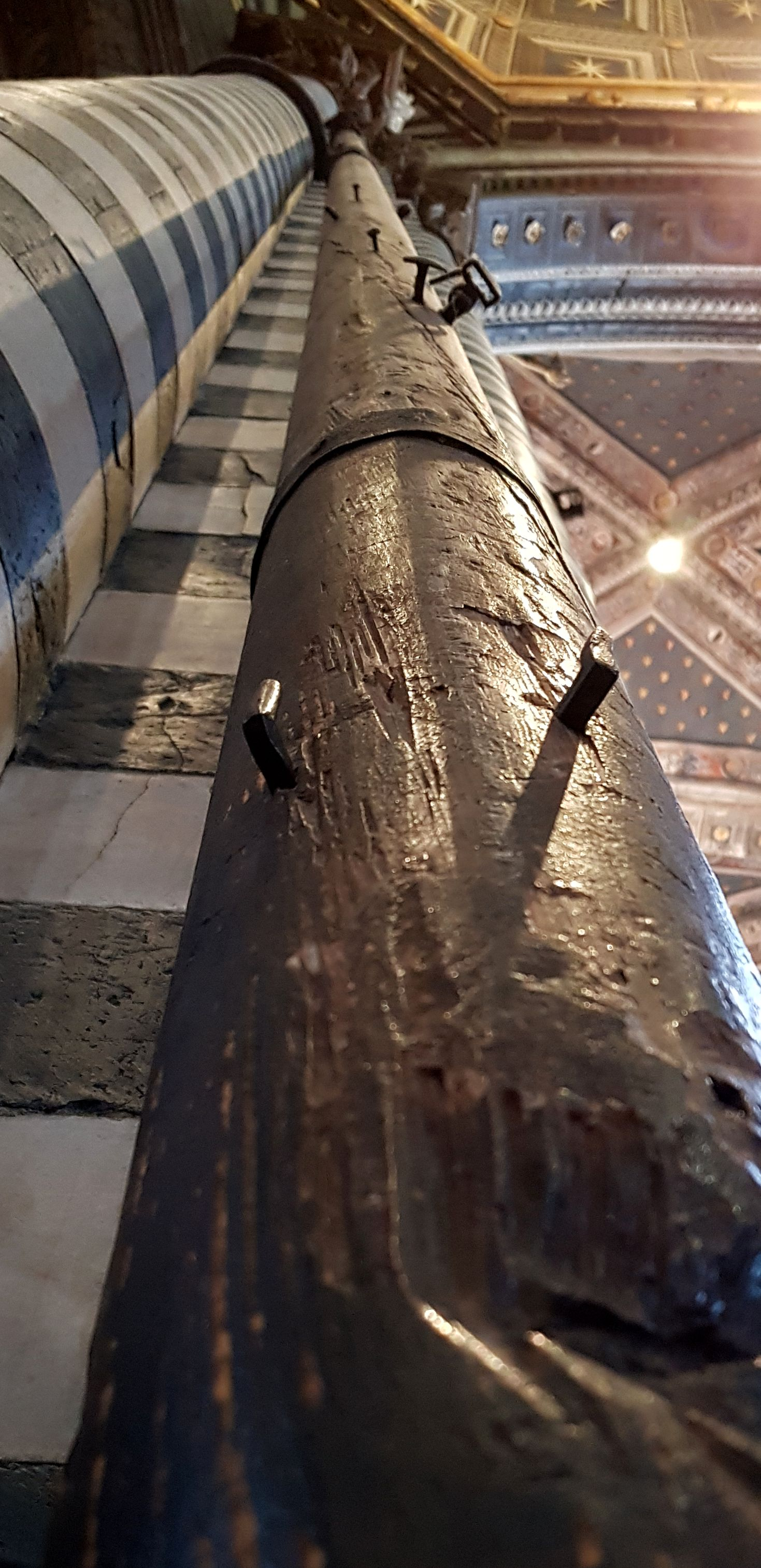
One of the two 18-metre-tall flagpoles in the Siena Cathedral. During the battle of Montaperti (1260), Bocca degli Abati, a Sienese spy, brought Florence's flag down, causing panic among the Florentine soldiers and ultimately their defeat.

A flagpole, flagmast, flagstaff, or staff is a pole designed to support a flag. If it is taller than can be easily reached to raise the flag, a cord is used, looping around a pulley at the top of the pole with the ends tied at the bottom. The flag is fixed to one lower end of the cord, and is then raised by pulling on the other end. The cord is then tightened and tied to the pole at the bottom. The pole is usually topped by a flat plate or ball called a "truck" (originally meant to keep a wooden pole from splitting) or a finial in a more complex shape. Very high flagpoles may require more complex support structures than a simple pole, such as a guyed mast.

Dwajasthambam are flagpoles commonly found at the entrances of South Indian Hindu temples.

== Design ==
Flagpoles are usually made of wood or metal. Flagpoles can be designed in one piece with a taper (typically a steel taper or a Greek entasis taper), or be made from multiple pieces to make them able to expand. In the United States, ANSI/NAAMM guide specification FP-1001-97 covers the engineering design of metal flagpoles to ensure safety.

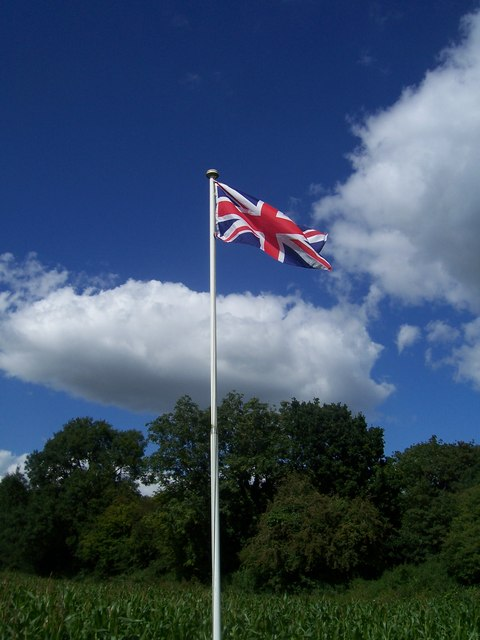
Flagpole of modest size, with simple truck (United Kingdom)

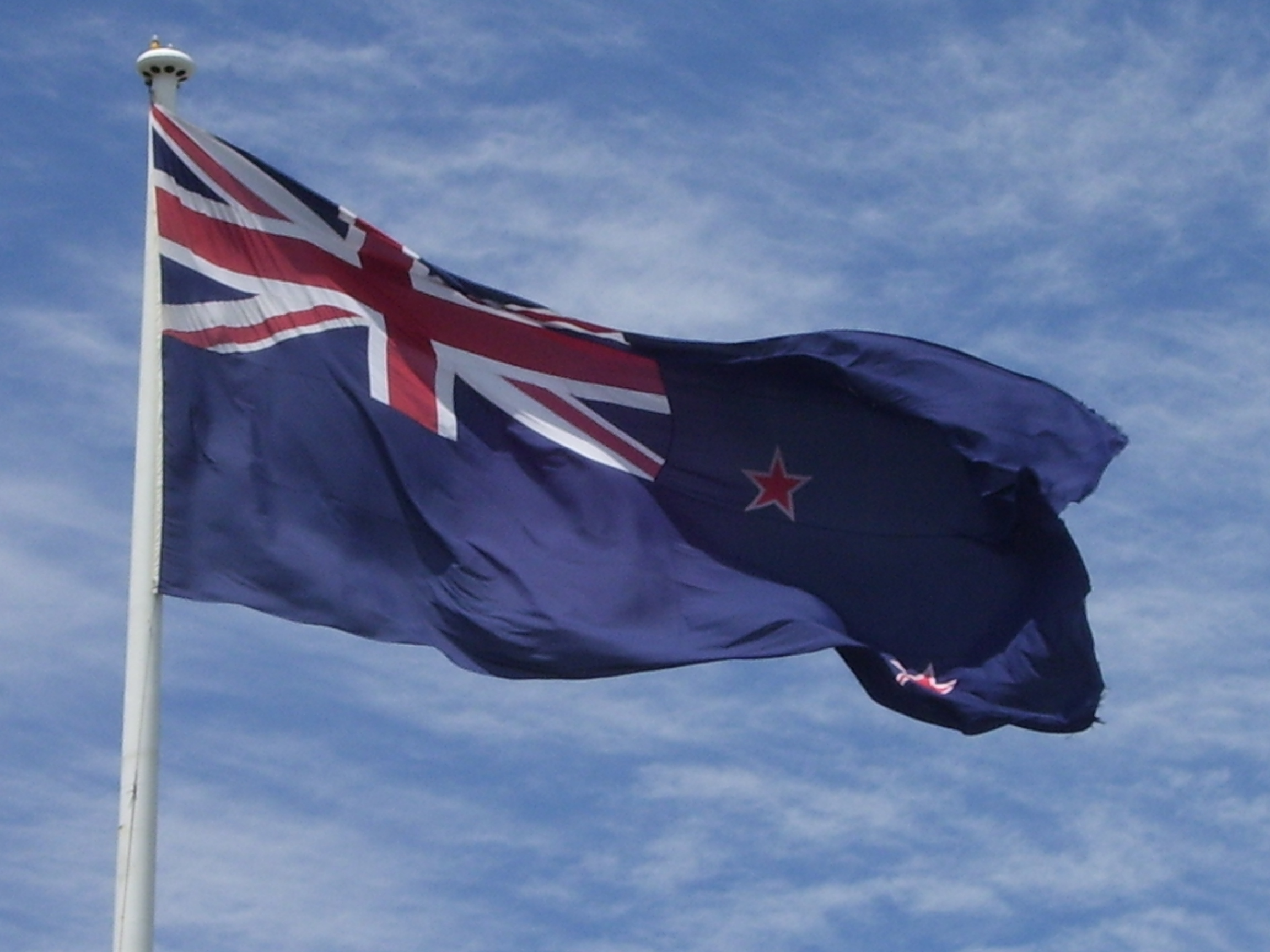
Large flagpole, showing structured truck (New Zealand)

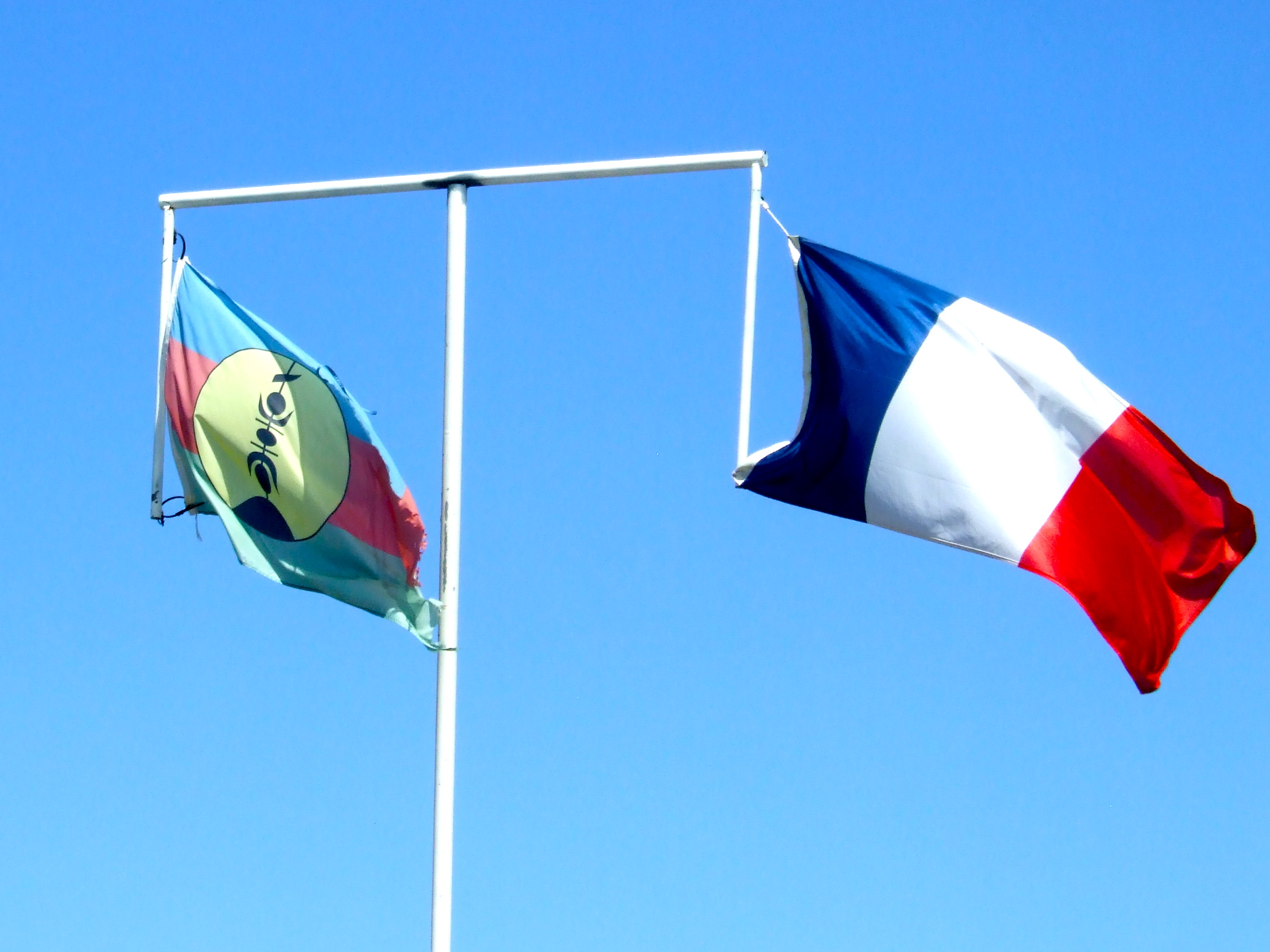
New Caledonia has two flags, flown here in Nouméa, the capital city, on a single flagpole with a crossbar

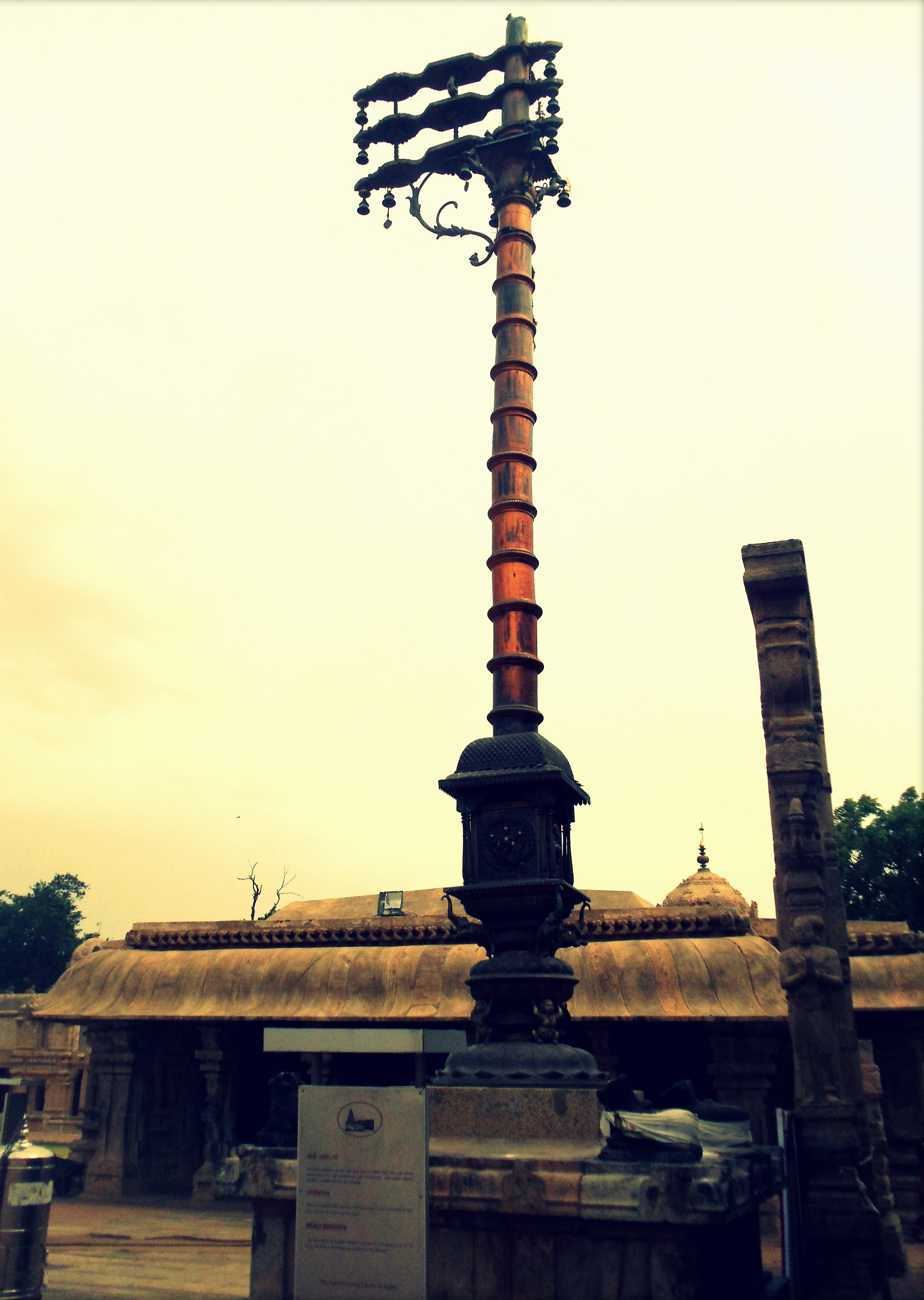
Dwajasthambam (flagpole) at Brihadeeswarar Temple in Thanjavur, Tamil Nadu, India

Diagram of a nautical flagstaff, which may be used on land but is arranged as a ship's mast, commonly used at naval bases and yacht clubs.

== Flag orientation ==
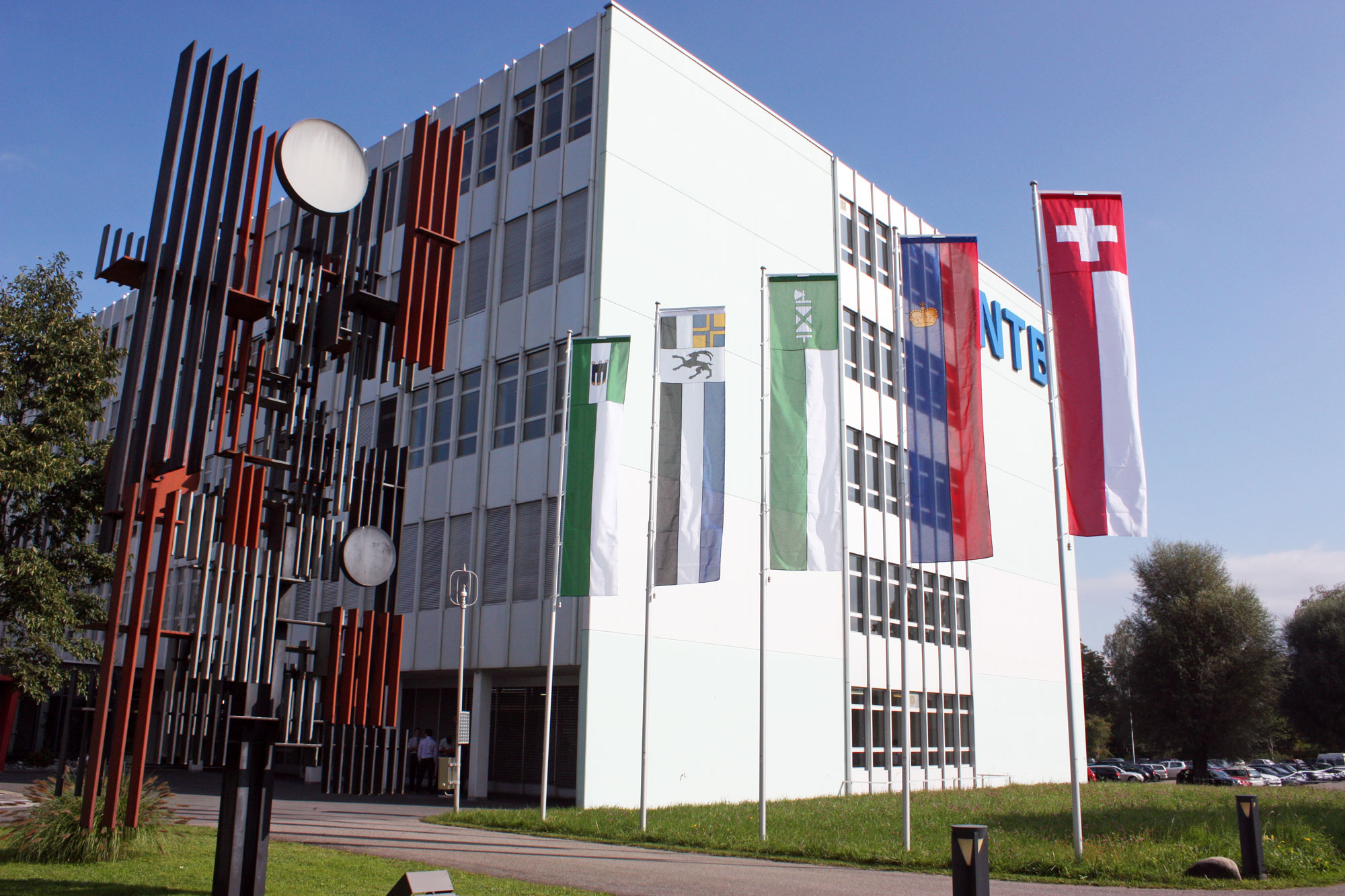
Vertical flags in Switzerland

Most flags are flown horizontally, with the shorter edge attached to the pole (no. 1 in the following illustration.) Vertical flags, with the longer edge attached to the pole, are sometimes used in lieu of the standard horizontal flag in central and eastern Europe, particularly in the German-speaking countries. This practice came about because the relatively brisk wind needed to display horizontal flags is not common in these countries. Nevertheless, horizontal flags are still the most common even in these countries.

The standard vertical flag (German: Hochformatflagge or Knatterflagge; no. 2) is a vertical form of the standard flag. The flag's design may remain unchanged (No. 2a) or it may change, e.g. by altering horizontal stripes to vertical ones (no. 2b). If the flag carries an emblem, it may remain centred or may be shifted slightly upwards.

The vertical flag for hoisting from a beam (German: Auslegerflagge or Galgenflagge; no. 3) is additionally attached to a horizontal beam, ensuring that it is fully displayed even if there is no wind.

The vertical flag for hoisting from a horizontal pole (German: Hängeflagge; no. 4) is hoisted from a horizontal pole, normally attached to a building. The topmost stripe on the horizontal version of the flag faces away from the building.

The vertical flag for hoisting from a crossbar or banner (German: Bannerflagge; no. 5) is firmly attached to a horizontal crossbar from which it is hoisted, either by a vertical pole (no. 5a) or a horizontal one (no. 5b). The topmost stripe on the horizontal version of the flag normally faces to the left.

== Record heights ==
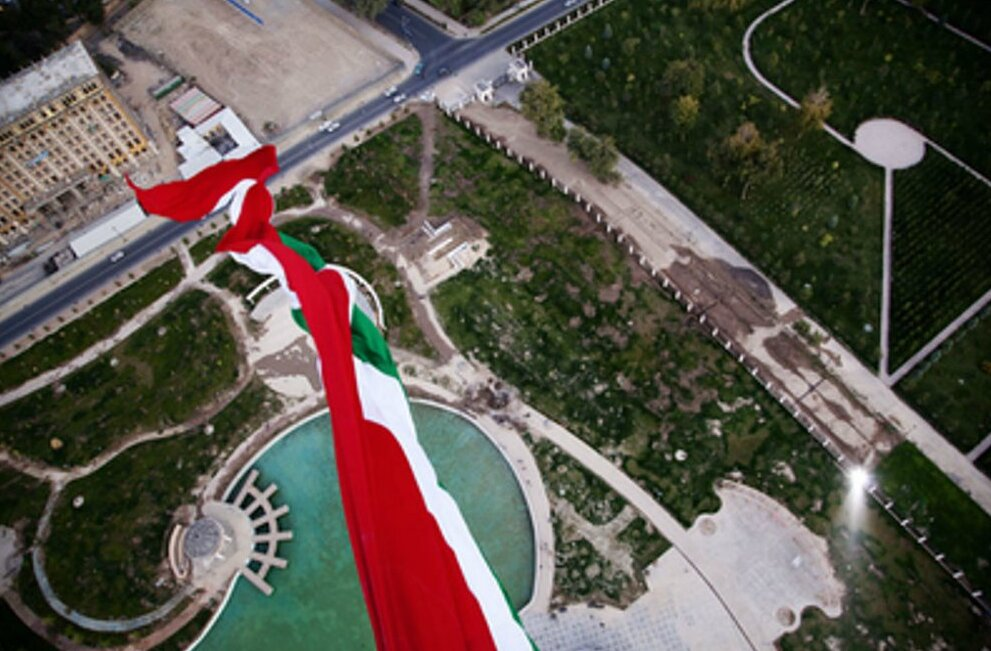
View from the top of the Dushanbe flagpole.

Since 26 December 2021, the tallest free-standing flagpole in the world is the New Capital Flagpole, located in The New Capital, Egypt at a height of 201.952 m (662.57 ft), exceeding the former record holders, the Jeddah Flagpole in Saudi Arabia (height: 171 m, 561 ft) and the Dushanbe Flagpole in Tajikistan (height: 165 m, 541 ft).

Following this, the St. Petersburg Flagpoles were erected in Russia in June 2023. At 175 m (574 ft 2 in) tall, they became the third, fourth and fifth tallest flagpoles in the world.

The flagpole in North Korea is the ninth tallest flagpole in the world, however, it is not free-standing. It is a radio tower supported-flagpole.

Many of these were built by American company Trident Support: the Dushanbe Flagpole, the first National Flagpole in Azerbaijan, the Ashgabat flagpole in Turkmenistan at 133 m (436 ft); the Aqaba Flagpole in Jordan at 130 m (430 ft); the Raghadan Flagpole in Jordan at 126.8 m (416 ft); and the Abu Dhabi Flagpole in the United Arab Emirates at 122 m (400 ft).

The current tallest flagpole in India is the 110-metre (360 ft) flagpole in Belgaum, Karnataka which was first hoisted on 12 March 2018. The tallest flagpole in the United Kingdom from 1959 until 2007 stood in Kew Gardens. It was made from a Canadian Douglas-fir tree and was 68.5 m (225 ft) in height.

The current tallest flagpole in the United States (and the tallest flying an American flag) is the 400-foot (120 m) pole completed before Memorial Day 2014 and custom-made with an 11-foot (3.4 m) base in concrete by wind turbine manufacturer Broadwind Energy. It is situated on the north side of the Acuity Insurance headquarters campus along Interstate 43 in Sheboygan, Wisconsin, and is visible from Cedar Grove. The pole can fly a 220-pound flag for in light wind conditions and a heavier 350-pound flag in higher wind conditions.
