= Kharkiv Flagpole =

Ukrainian flagpole raised in 2021

Coordinates: 49°59′24″N 36°13′38″E

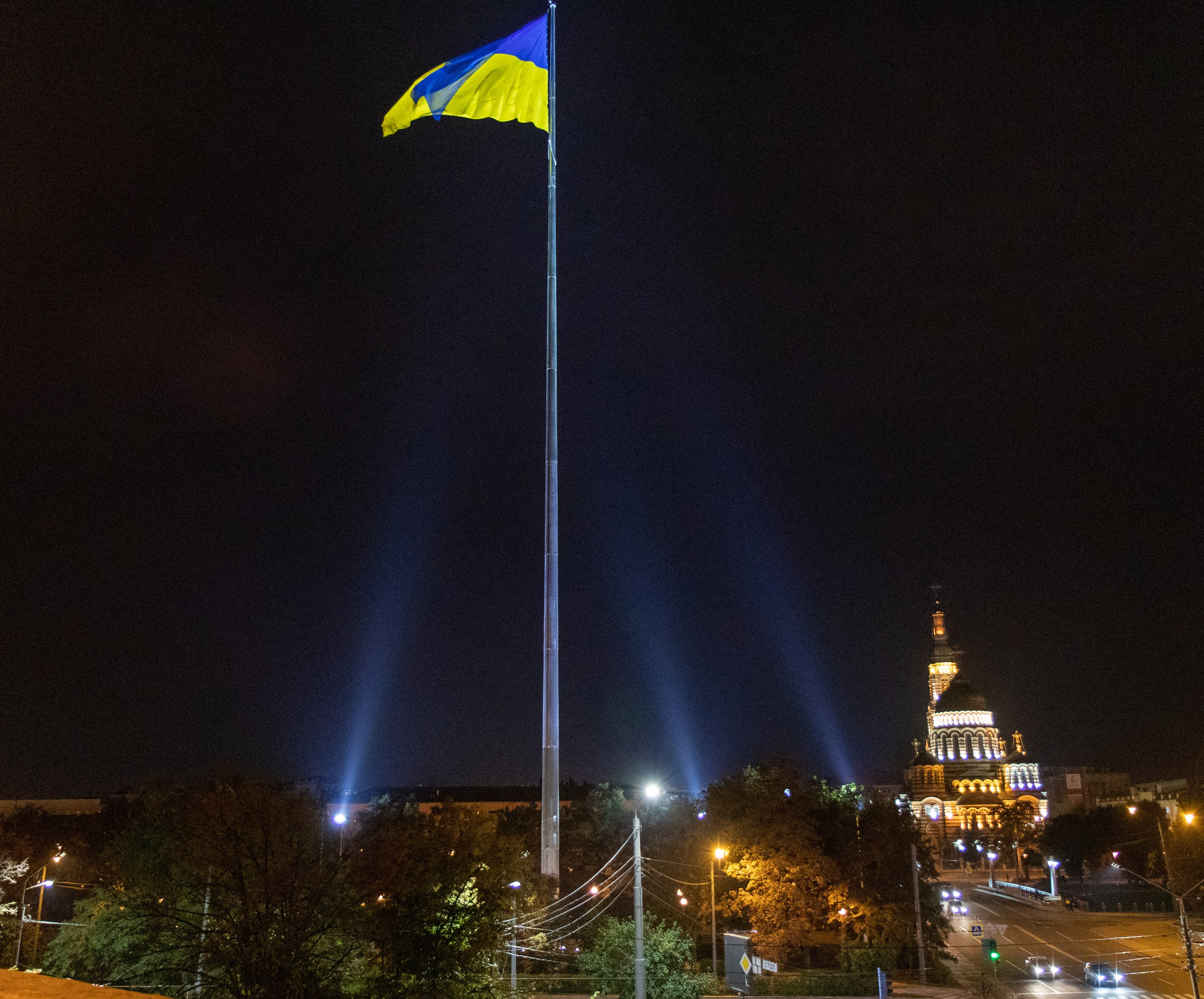
The Kharkiv flagpole, raised on August 24, 2021

The Kharkiv flagpole was officially raised on August 24, 2021, to commemorate Ukrainian National Flag Day celebrated on August 23. It is 101 meters (306 ft) high, making it the 30th-highest flagpole in the world. The flag is 22.5-meters by 15-meters.
