= List of flagpoles by height =

This list of flagpoles by height includes completed flagpoles which are either free–standing or supported, excluding the height of any pedestal (plinth), building, or other base platform which may elevate them. Due to the list's incomplete nature, flagpoles shorter than 100m (330ft) are not ranked.

bold	Denotes flagpole that is or was once the tallest in the world

Rank	Flagpole	Image	Location	Country	Flag (If different from national flag)	Height meters (feet)	Completed	Type	Coordinates
1	Cairo Flagpole		New Administrative Capital, Cairo	Egypt		201.952 m (662.57 ft)	26 December 2021	Free–standing	30°0′48.70″N 31°45′17.52″E
2	National Flag Square Flagpole 2 (2024-now)		Neftchiler Avenue, Bayil, Baku	Azerbaijan		195 m (640 ft)	2 August 2024	Free–standing	40°20′39.47″N 49°50′41.64″E
3	Saint Petersburg Flagpoles		Saint Petersburg	Russia	Russian Empire; Soviet Union; Russian Federation	175 m (574 ft)	16 June 2023	Free–standing	59°58′50″N 30°11′35″E
4	Jeddah Flagpole		King Abdullah Square, Jeddah	Saudi Arabia		171 m (561 ft)	23 September 2014	Free–standing	21°30′27.23″N 39°10′11.03″E
5	Dushanbe Flagpole		Dushanbe	Tajikistan		165 m (541 ft)	24 May 2011	Free–standing	38°34′44.4″N 68°46′48.36″E
6	National Flag Square Flagpole 1 (2010-2017)		Neftchiler Avenue, Bayil, Baku	Azerbaijan		162 m (531 ft)	1 September 2010	Free–standing	40°20′39.47″N 49°50′41.64″E
7	Kijong-dong Flagpole		Kijong-dong, Kaesong	North Korea		160 m (525 ft)	1982	Supported	37°56′42.99″N 126°39′18.78″E
8	Holy Defence Garden Museum Flagpole		Tehran	Iran		150 m (490 ft)	21 September 2012	Free–standing	35°45′07.7″N 51°25′23.7″E
9	Wagah Flagpole		Wagah	Pakistan		135 m (443 ft)	2025	Free–standing	31°36′15.95″N 74°34′16.07″E
10	Ashgabat Flagpole		Ashgabat	Turkmenistan		133 m (436 ft)	29 June 2008	Free–standing	37°53′13.2″N 58°21′1.8″E
11	Aqaba Flagpole		Aqaba	Jordan	Arab Revolt	130 m (430 ft)	3 October 2004	Free–standing	29°31′18.12″N 35°0′4″E
12	Attari Flagpole 2		Attari, Punjab	India		127.4 m (418 ft)	3 March 2023	Free Standing	31°36′18.7″N 74°34′31.5″E
13	Raghadan Flagpole		Amman	Jordan		126.8 m (416 ft)	10 June 2003	Free–standing	31°58′8.15″N 35°56′8.18″E
14	Al Khuwair Square Flagpole		Muscat	Oman		126 m (413 ft)	22 May 2025	Free–standing	23°35′52.692″N 58°25′55.0704″E
15	Hospet Flagpole		Hospet, Karnataka	India		123.4 m (405 ft)	15 August 2022	Free–standing	15°16′32.65″N 76°22′45.56″E
18	Abu Dhabi Flagpole		Abu Dhabi	United Arab Emirates		123 m (404 ft)	2 December 2001	Free–standing	24°28′39.78″N 54°19′55.6″E
18	Jumeirah Flagpole		Dubai	United Arab Emirates		123 m (404 ft)	2017	Free–standing	25°14′28.40″N 55°16′4.35″E
18	Sharjah Flagpole		Sharjah	United Arab Emirates		123 m (404 ft)	November 2012	Free–standing	25°20′47.31″N 55°22′41.28″E
22	Selangor State Flagpole		Shah Alam, Selangor	Malaysia	Selangor	120 m (390 ft)	7 March 2026	Free–standing	3°04′31.8″N 101°32′09.4″E
22	Acuity Flagpole		Sheboygan, Wisconsin	United States		120 m (390 ft)	24 May 2014	Free–standing	43°43′47.16″N 87°45′23.56″W
22	Ajman Flagpole		Ajman	United Arab Emirates		120 m (390 ft)	November 2013	Free–standing	25°24′45.78″N 55°29′54.54″E
22	Ras Al Khaimah Flagpole		Ras Al Khaimah	United Arab Emirates		120 m (390 ft)	November 2013	Free–standing	25°46′20.36″N 55°56′20.34″E
22	Fujairah Flagpole		Fujairah	United Arab Emirates		120 m (390 ft)	November 2014	Free–standing	25°7′15.47″N 56°17′0.04″E
23	Umm Al Quwain Flagpole		Umm Al Quwain	United Arab Emirates		120 m (390 ft)	November 2014	Free–standing	25°34′6.78″N 55°33′58.28″E
24	Piedras Negras Flagpole		Piedras Negras	Mexico		120 m (390 ft)	23 December 2010	Free–standing	28°42′19.49″N 100°30′51.48″W
25	Kavak Flagpole		Kavak	Turkey		116 m (381 ft)	2010	Free-standing	41°04′57.18″N 36°04′28.06″E
26	Iguala Flagpole		Iguala	Mexico		113.8 m (373 ft)	24 February 1998	Free–standing	18°19′44.67″N 99°31′58.15″W
=27	Rozhen Flagpole		Rozhen	Bulgaria		111 m (364 ft)	13 July 2023	Free-standing	41°40′14.5056″N 24°43′43.9104″E
=27	Çamlıca Hill Flagpole		Çamlıca Hill, Istanbul	Turkey		111 m (364 ft)	23 April 2021	Free-standing	41°1′40.80″N 29°4′10.95″E
=28	Ankara Flagpole		Ankara	Turkey		110 m (360 ft)	2009	Free–standing	39°55′22.75″N 32°52′32.13″E
=28	Umayyad Park Flagpole		Damascus, Syria	Syria		110 m (360 ft)	4 June 2025	Free–standing	33°31′0.397″N 36°16′5.68″E
=28	Belgaum Flagpole		Belgaum, Karnataka	India		110 m (360 ft)	12 March 2018	Free–standing	15°52′12.60″N 74°31′43.17″E
=28	Attari Flagpole 1		Attari border, Punjab	India		110 m (360 ft)	5 March 2017	Free–standing	31°36′19.16″N 74°34′34.94″E
29	Krestovy Island Flagpole		Saint Petersburg	Russia	FC Zenit	105 m (344 ft)	2020	Free–standing	59°58′14.48″N 30°12′48.16″E
30	Kharkiv Flagpole		Kharkiv	Ukraine		102 m (335 ft)	2021	Free–standing	49°59′23.95″N 36°13′37.74″E
=31	Hamina Flagpole		Hamina	Finland		100 m (330 ft)	5 November 2019	Free–standing	60°33′49.07″N 27°11′53.41″E
=31	National Flagpole at the Praça dos Três Poderes		Brasília	Brazil		100 m (330 ft)	19 November 1972	Supported	15°48′2.9″S 47°51′35.8″W
=31	Mirador del Obispado		Monterrey, Nuevo León	Mexico		100 m (330 ft)	24 February 2005	Free-standing	25°40′34.79″N 100°20′47.39″W
=31	Heroico Colegio Militar Flagpole		Mexico City	Mexico		100 m (330 ft)		Free-standing	19°15′26.11″N 99°08′54.60″W
=31	Campo Marte Flagpole		Campo Marte, Mexico City	Mexico		100 m (330 ft)		Free-standing	19°25′27.62″N 99°11′47.72″W
=31	San Jerónimo Flagpole		San Jerónimo Lídice, Mexico City	Mexico		100 m (330 ft)		Free-standing	19°19′52.08″N 99°12′39.56″W
=31	Tijuana Flagpole		Tijuana, Baja California	Mexico		100 m (330 ft)		Free-standing	32°31′14.87″N 117°2′11.20″W
=31	El Chamizal Flagpole		Ciudad Juárez, Chihuahua	Mexico		100 m (330 ft)		Free-standing	31°45′18.44″N 106°27′12.89″W
=31	Ensenada Flagpole		Ensenada, Baja California	Mexico		100 m (330 ft)		Free-standing	31°51′33.51″N 116°37′27.34″W
=31	Cancún Flagpole		Cancún, Quintana Roo	Mexico		100 m (330 ft)		Free-standing	21°08′37.65″N 86°46′42.38″W
=31	Nuevo Laredo Flagpole		Nuevo Laredo, Tamaulipas	Mexico		100 m (330 ft)		Free-standing	27°29′51.52″N 99°30′15.88″W
=31	Chihuahua Flagpole		Chihuahua, Chihuahua	Mexico		100 m (330 ft)		Free-standing	28°38′25.32″N 106°05′11.91″W
=31	Dolores Hidalgo Flagpole		Dolores Hidalgo, Guanajuato	Mexico		100 m (330 ft)		Free-standing	21°09′33.22″N 100°54′35.47″W
=31	San Luis Potosí Flagpole		San Luis Potosí, San Luis Potosí	Mexico		100 m (330 ft)		Free-standing	22°08′59.″N 100°58′30″W
32	Daeseong-dong Flagpole		Daeseong-dong, Paju, Gyeonggi Province	South Korea		99.8 m (327 ft)	1982	Supported	37°56′28.03″N 126°40′44.92″E
33	Sarawak Flagpole		Kuching, Sarawak	Malaysia	Sarawak	99 m (325 ft)	November 2023	Free-standing	1°33′36.7″N 110°20′54.9″E
34	Gandhi Mandap Flagpole		Guwahati, Assam	India		97.4 m (320 ft)	Late 2010s	Free–standing	26°10′38.43″N 91°46′3.44″E
35	Merdeka Square Flagpole		Merdeka Square, Kuala Lumpur	Malaysia		95 m (312 ft)	October 1989	Free–standing	3°18′51.36″N 101°41′36.924″E
36	Bukit Bendera IKN Flagpole		Nusantara	Indonesia		79 m (259,186 ft)	August 17, 2024	Free–standing	0°57′59.0″S 116°42′11.1″E
37	National Park flagpole		Ulaanbaatar	Mongolia		65 m (213.255 ft)	August 24, 2026	Free–standing	47°53′45.98″N 106°55′40.36″E
38	Long An International Port Flagpole		Tân Tập, Tây Ninh province	Vietnam		63 m (207 ft)	June 24, 2023	Free–standing	10°31′56.7″N 106°44′05.5″E

== See also ==
- List of tallest bridges
- List of tallest buildings
- List of tallest structures
