= Hamina Flagpole =

Tallest flagpole in Finland

- Haminan lipputanko
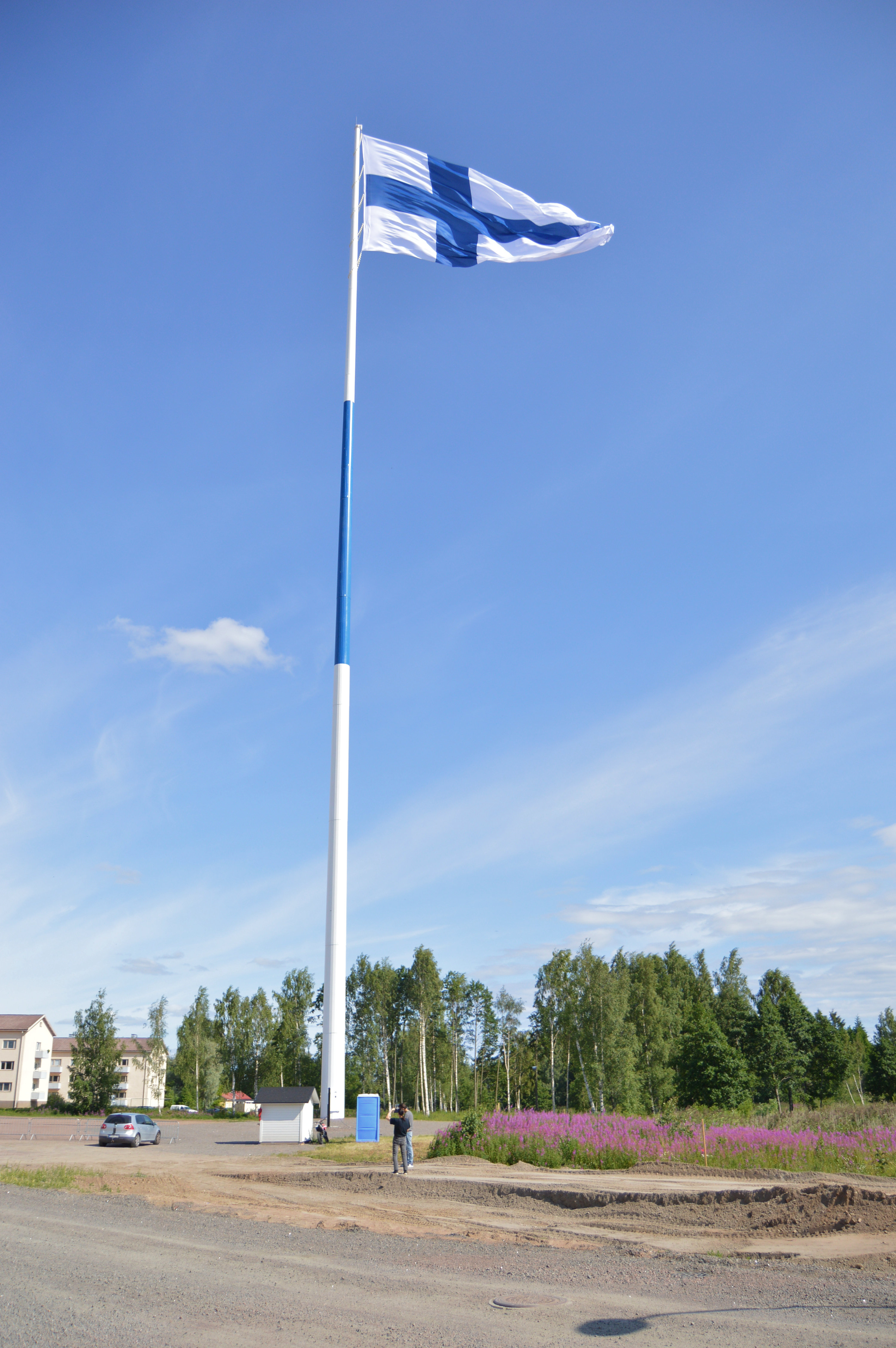
- Interactive map of Hamina Flagpole

General information
- Location: Hamina, Finland
- Coordinates: 60.563632°N 27.198720°E
- Height: 100 m (328 ft)

The Hamina Flagpole is the tallest flagpole in Finland, standing at 100 m (328 ft 1 in) tall. It is located near Oolanninpuisto Park in the town of Hamina, in southeastern Finland. The flagpole was inaugurated to commemorate the centenary of Finland’s independence and is the central feature of the broader Flag World initiative, a cultural and tourist project celebrating Finnish national symbols and flag heritage.

== History and purpose ==
The idea for the flagpole and the Flag World complex was initiated by Kimmo Kiljunen, a former member of parliament and flag researcher, who serves as the CEO of the Flag World company. The project was funded primarily by the City of Hamina, with additional contributions from public fundraising efforts and foreign countries as a symbolic gesture of goodwill toward Finland on its centenary.

Originally scheduled to be completed in May 2018 to mark the 100th anniversary of the Finnish flag, the flagpole faced construction delays and cost overruns. Safety concerns, particularly about the structural calculations used by the Russian manufacturer Amira Group, delayed the planned flag-raising ceremony, with the pole not being cleared yet by December of that year. The flagpole would only receive a permanent building permit in December 2019, but has since become a prominent landmark in the region.

== The flag ==
The flag flown on the pole is the Monumental Finnish Flag, measuring 16.5 metres by 27 metres and weighing around 55 kilograms. On windy days, the flag is lowered for safety by the Hamina volunteer fire department and raised again in suitable weather.

== Status and controversies ==
At the time of its unveiling, the Hamina Flagpole was the tallest in Europe. However, it has since been surpassed by taller flagpoles in several countries, including Russia and Ukraine.

The project also drew criticism for its high cost, approximately 800 thousand euros, as well as the delays and concerns over the background of involved contractors. In particular, media coverage raised issues about the CEO of ADS Finland, a company linked to the flagpole effort, who had prior convictions for drug and financial crimes.

== In popular culture ==
The Hamina Flagpole appears prominently in the Finnish television series The Man Who Died, based on the novel by Antti Tuomainen.
