= Truck (rigging) =

Part of ship's rigging

A truck is a wooden ball, disk, or bun-shaped cap at the top of a mast, with holes in it through which flag halyards are passed. Trucks are also used on wooden flagpoles, to prevent them from splitting.

Without a masthead truck, water could easily seep into the circular growth rings of a wooden mast. However, the grain in the truck is perpendicular to that of the mast, allowing the water to run off it.

Multi-masted vessels may have a main-truck on the main-mast and a mizzen-truck on the mizzen-mast, etc.

== Flagpoles ==
Flagpoles often have a truck on top of them which often holds a decorative piece above, known as a finial, which is usually a ball. They are usually made of solid metal, however a tradition in the United States is to sometimes put a razor, a penny, or a grain of rice inside.
