= Muscat flagpole =

Flagpole in Oman

- سارية مسقط
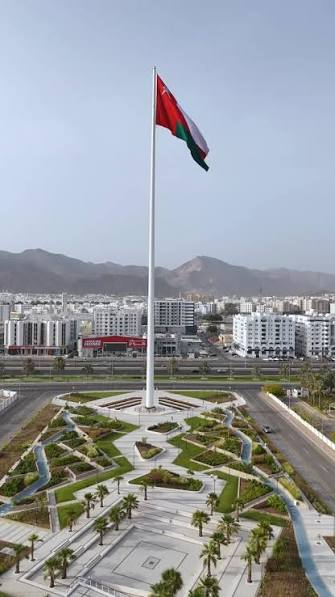
- Al Khuwair Square Flagpole
- Interactive map of the Muscat flagpole area

General information
- Location: Al Khuwair, Muscat, Oman
- Coordinates: 23.59800720038534°N 58.43196264826646°E
- Inaugurated: 22 May 2025

Height
- Height: 126 m (413 ft)

The Muscat Flagpole, also known as Al Khuwair Square flagpole, is a free-standing flagpole in Al Khuwair, Muscat, Oman. With a height of 126 metres (413 ft), it stands as the 14th tallest flagpole in the world and the tallest man-made structure in Oman. The flag was hoisted on 22 May 2025, by Sayyid Saud bin Hilal Al Busaidi, Governor of Muscat and Ahmed bin Mohammed Al Humaidi, Chairman of Muscat Municipality. At the time of completion, the flagpole was the 5th tallest flagpole in the Arab world, behind the Raghadan Flagpole in Amman, Jordan with the difference of merely 0.8 m (2.6 ft).

== Al Khuwair Square ==
The flagpole is constructed in the Al Khuwair Square (along the prestigious Sultan Qaboos street), as part of a development project launched in 23 April 2024. In an area of 18,000 sq.m, the square features palm trees, walking and cycling paths, a skate park, and an arts and crafts exhibition, along with the flagpole. The $10 million project was developed by the private sector, and funded entirely by Jindal Steel, Sohar.

== Flag ==
The Omani flag measures 18 m (59 ft) in length and 31.5 m (103 ft) in breadth. Constructed with 135 tonnes of steel, the pole has an outer diameter of 280 cm at the base, and tapers to 90 cm at the top. It also features an aviation obstruction light on top.
