= Ashgabat Flagpole =

Flagpole in Ashgabat, Turkmenistan

- Türkmenistanyň Baş Baýdagy
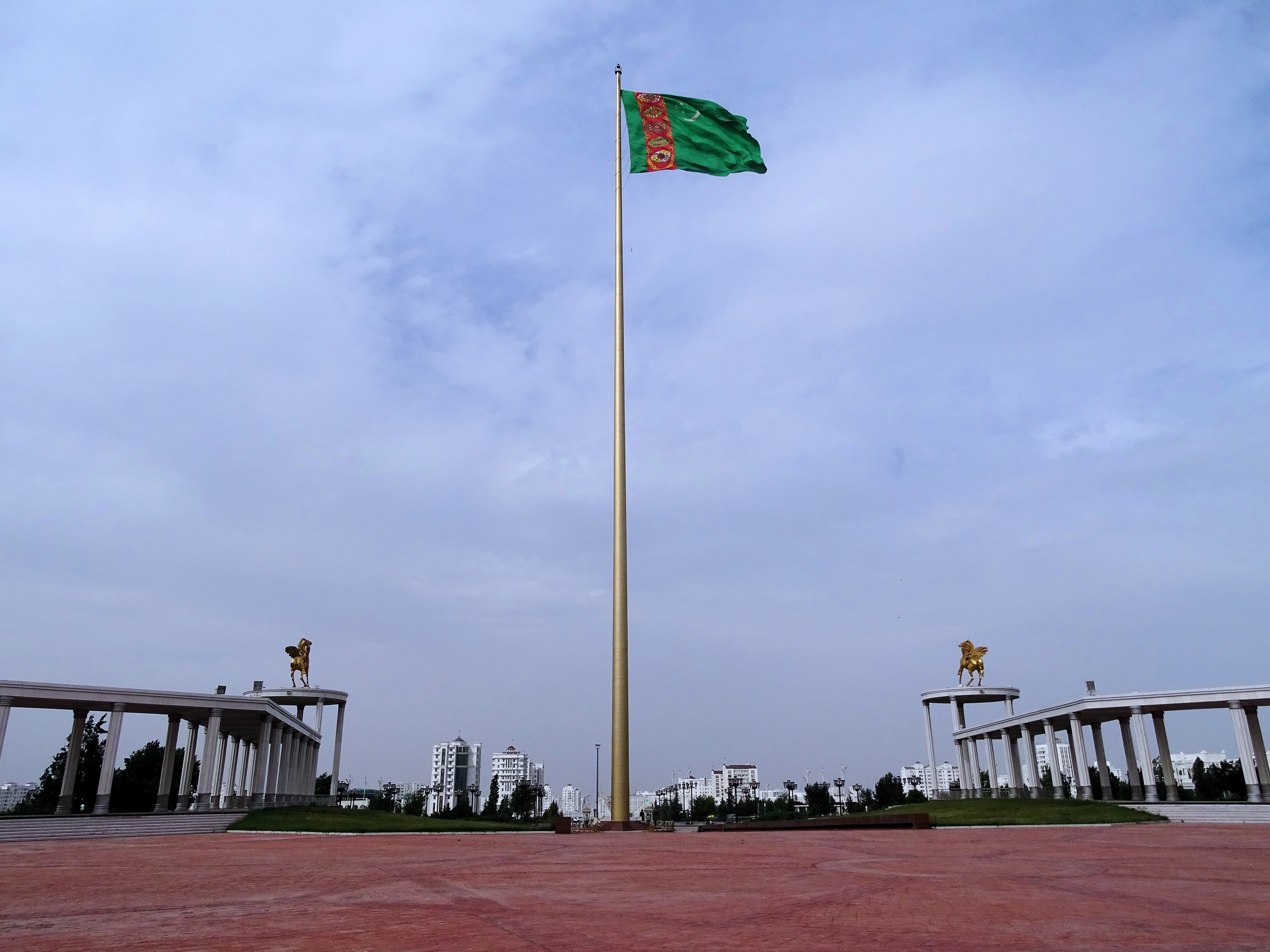
- Ashgabat Flagpole
- Interactive map of the Ashgabat Flagpole area

General information
- Location: Ashgabat, Turkmenistan
- Coordinates: 37.8870°N 58.3505°E
- Completed: 29 June 2008

Height
- Height: 133 m (436 ft)

The Ashgabat Flagpole (Turkmen: Türkmenistanyň Baş Baýdagy, lit. ''Main flag of Turkmenistan'') is a flagpole in Ashgabat, Turkmenistan. It is 133 metres (436 feet) tall, making it the eighth tallest free–standing and ninth tallest flagpole in the world. It was erected on 29 June 2008. It was the tallest free–standing flagpole in the world until being surpassed by the 162 m (531 ft) National Flagpole in Azerbaijan on 1 September 2010. The Vice-president of the Guinness Book of World Records at the time, Greig Glenday, came to Ashgabat as a witness, and handed over a certificate of the record.

The flagpole flies a 52.5 m × 35 m (172 ft × 115 ft) flag of Turkemenistan which weighs 420 kilograms (930 pounds). The flagpole was built by the Turkish construction company Polimeks. who hired the specialist flagpole company, Trident Support Flagpoles based in Dubai, UAE, for the design and construction of the flagpole. The flagpole was Trident's 4th Guinness World Record flagpole. The ceremonial raising of the flag on 29 June 2008 was attended by members of the Turkmen government, representatives of public organisations, the media, and the people.

Despite the flagpole's height, it is not the tallest structure in Ashgabat. It is surpassed by the 211 metres (692 ft) tall Turkmenistan Tower in height by 78 metres.

== See also ==
- List of tallest buildings and structures in the world
