= Saint Petersburg Flagpoles =

Third tallest flagpoles

Coordinates: 59.98093°N 30.19545°E

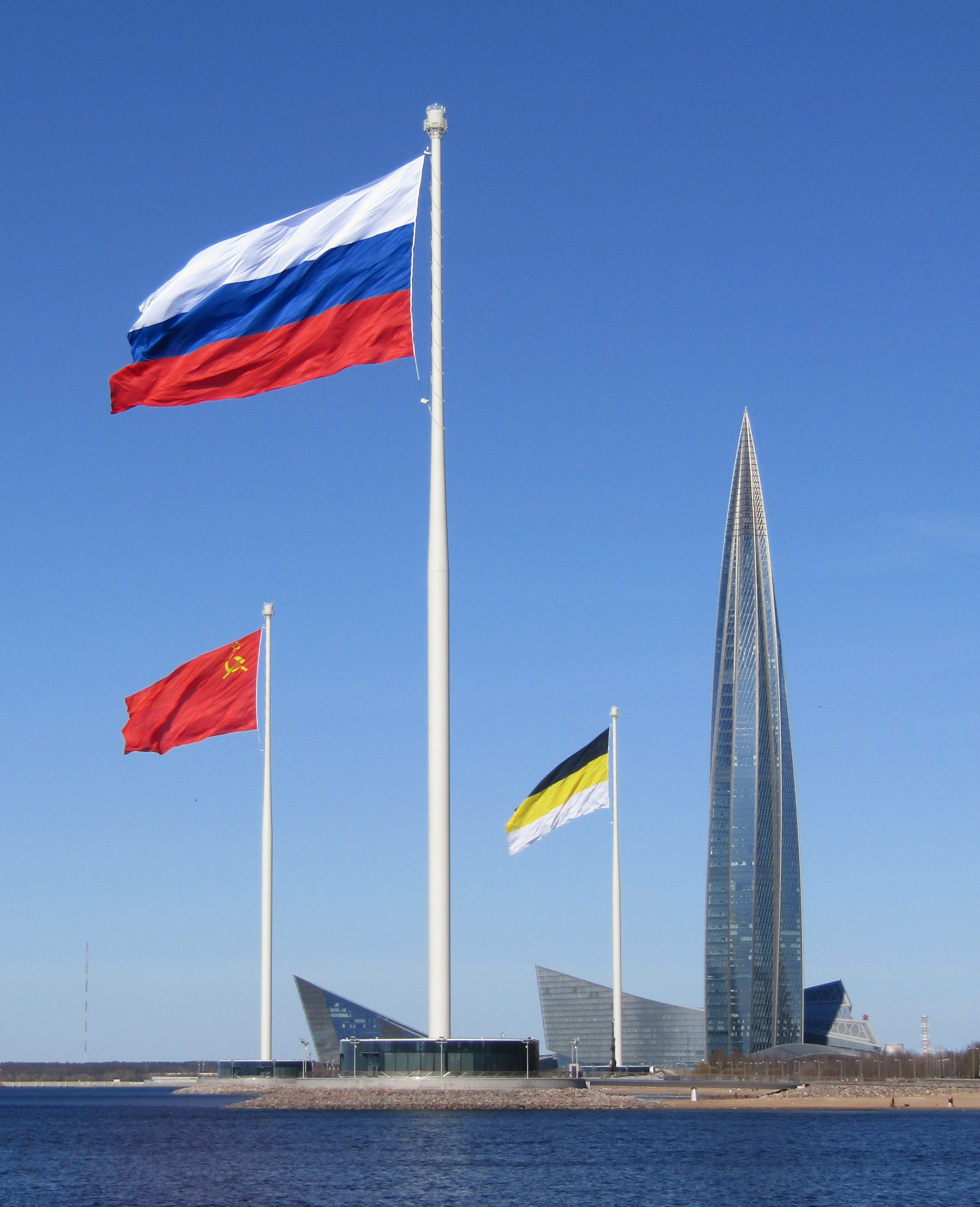
Picture of the Saint Petersburg Flagpoles.

The Saint Petersburg Flagpoles are the world's third tallest flagpoles at 175 m (574 ft 2 in) tall.

Located at the Park of the 300th Anniversary of St Petersburg, near the Lakhta Center in Saint Petersburg, they were erected in June 2023. The flags are the current flag of the Russian Federation, the flag of the Russian Empire and the flag of the Soviet Union.

The raising of the flags marked the following anniversaries:

- 330th anniversary of Peter the Great's tricolour (1693)
- 165 years of Tsar Alexander II's black-yellow-white flag (1858)
- 100 years of the institution of the red flag (1923)

The project was implemented by majority state-owned Gazprom, which is headquartered nearby at the Lakhta Centre.
