= Tarin =

Tarin may refer to:

- Tarin Jahan, Bangladeshi actress and model
- Tarin Kowt, a city in Afghanistan
- Tarin, Syria, a village in Syria
- Tarin Rock, Western Australia
- Tarin, character in The Legend of Zelda series
- Tareen, a Pashtun tribe, occasionally also spelt as 'Tarin'

== People with surname Tarin ==
- Sardar Muhammad Habib Khan Tarin (1829–1888), Pashtun tribal chieftain and warrior
- Abdul Majid Khan Tarin (1877–1939), British-Indian political figure
- Haris Tarin (born 1978), Afghan-American Muslim activist
- Pierre Tarin (1735–1761), French encyclopedist
- Rona Tarin (born 1971), Afghan politician and women's rights activist
- Shaukat Tarin (born 1953), Pakistani banker and finance specialist

== See also ==
- Tarim (disambiguation)
