= List of squares in Dushanbe =

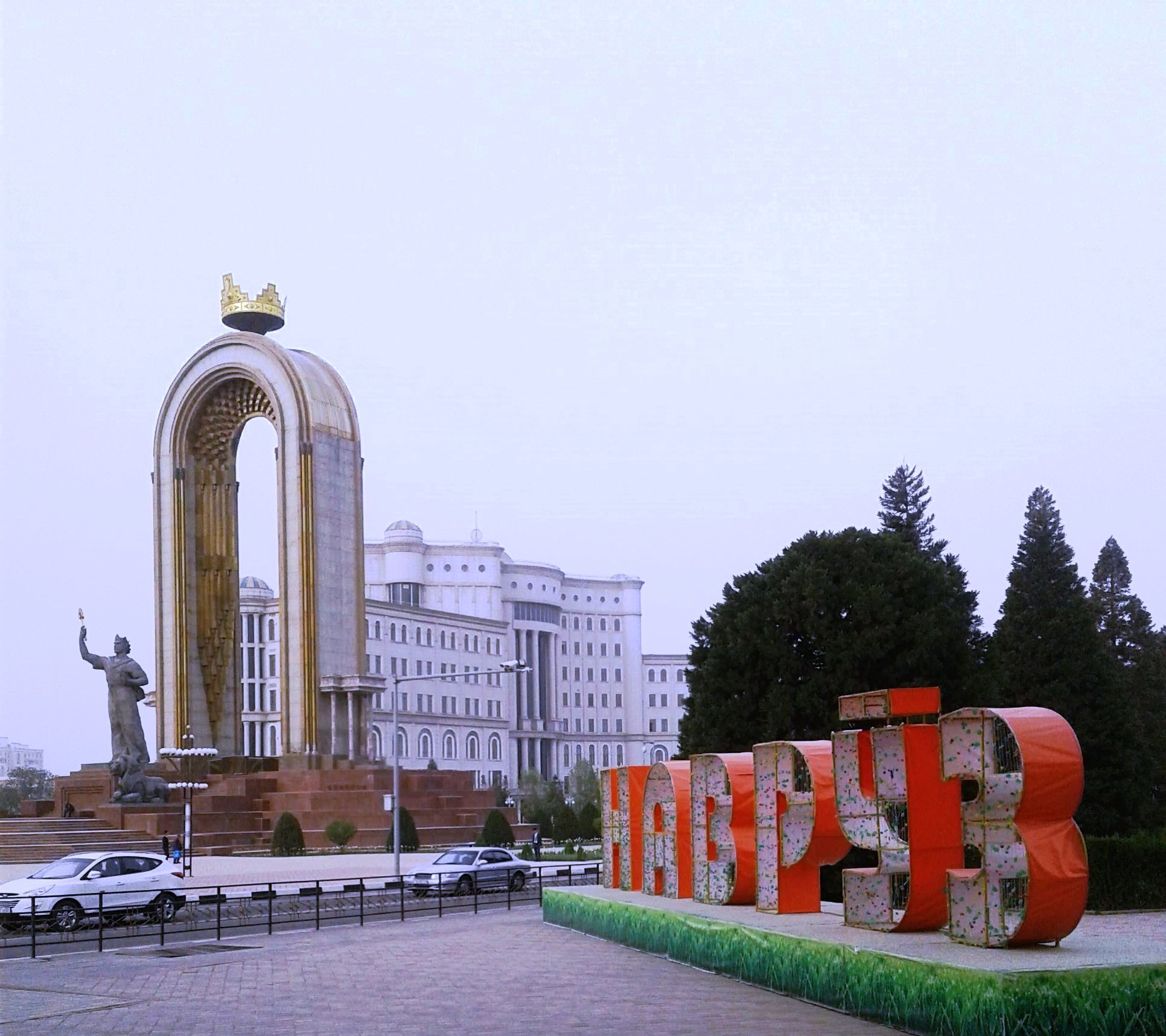
A celebratory Nowruz sign on Dousti Square.

This following is a list of central squares in Dushanbe, the capital of Tajikistan.

== List of squares ==
=== Dousti Square ===
This square is the main plaza in Dushanbe and in the country. The name "Dousti" the Tajik language word for friendship. It is connected to Rudaki Avenue and Hofizi Sherozi Avenue. It is the largest of its kind in Dushanbe. It was formerly known as Lenin Square, Ozodi Square and Somoni Square.

=== Istikol Square ===
Istiklol (Independence) Square was opened in honor of the 31st anniversary of independence in 2022. The center of the square is the 121-meter Istiklol Complex.

=== State Flag Square ===
The Dushanbe Flagpole is located in an area known as State Flag Square (Tajik: Боғи парчами Миллӣ) which is adjacent to the Palace of Nations and the Dushanbinka River. The entire square is decorated with alleys and paths with benches in combination with carpet greenery, trees, flowers and ornamental shrubs. The area was designed throughout the 60s, 70s and 80s. The flagpole located on the square had a Guinness Book of Records for being the tallest flagpole in the world until September 2014 (when the Jeddah Flagpole was created).

=== 800th Anniversary Square ===
The Square named after the 800th Anniversary of Moscow (Tajik: Майдони ба номи 800 солагии Москва) was prepared in 1939 by architects N. Bilibin, V. Golly, and A. Junger, with construction being carried out from 1939 to 1946. Initially, the square was called "Teatralnaya". In 1947 order of the local city executive committee, in honor of the octocentenary of the Soviet capital of Moscow, the area was renamed to its current name. In 2011, a park was landscaped located to the left of the theater building. In 2013, a major reconstruction of the main fountain was carried out.

=== Abu Ali ibn Sino Square ===
Abu Ali ibn Sino Square is a square located in Dushanbe, located at the intersection of Ismail Somoni Street and Abu Ali ibn Sino Avenue, opposite a Republican Hospital. The main aspect of the square is the monument to Avicenna, which erected to celebrate the 1000th anniversary of the Persian polymath. The monument was opened in 1980 and is a tall bronze figure, which depicts Avicenna holding a book in his hand.

=== Sadriddin Ayni Square ===
Ayni Square is named after Sadriddin Ayni, considered to be the founding father of Soviet Tajik literature, as well as the first citizen who was awarded the title of Hero of Tajikistan. The square was opened in 1978, when the nation celebrated his centennial. Nearby is. the Republican Museum of History and Local Lore and Fine Arts, the premises of which the main museum of Tajikistan was located until 2013.

=== Karabaev Square ===
Karabaev Square is located at the intersection of Karabayev Street and Saadi Sherazi Avenue, the latter of which runs from east to west. The square includes buildings such as that of the Tajik National Circus (south-eastern corner of the square), the republican court and an extension of Tajikagroinvestbank. It was created in the 1970s, after the construction of a wide 4-lane avenue named after Negmat Karabaev (the first Hero of the Soviet Union from the Tajik SSR). In 2011–2012, the avenue was reconstructed, and the roadway and sidewalks were expanded to accommodate the square.

=== Rudaki Square ===
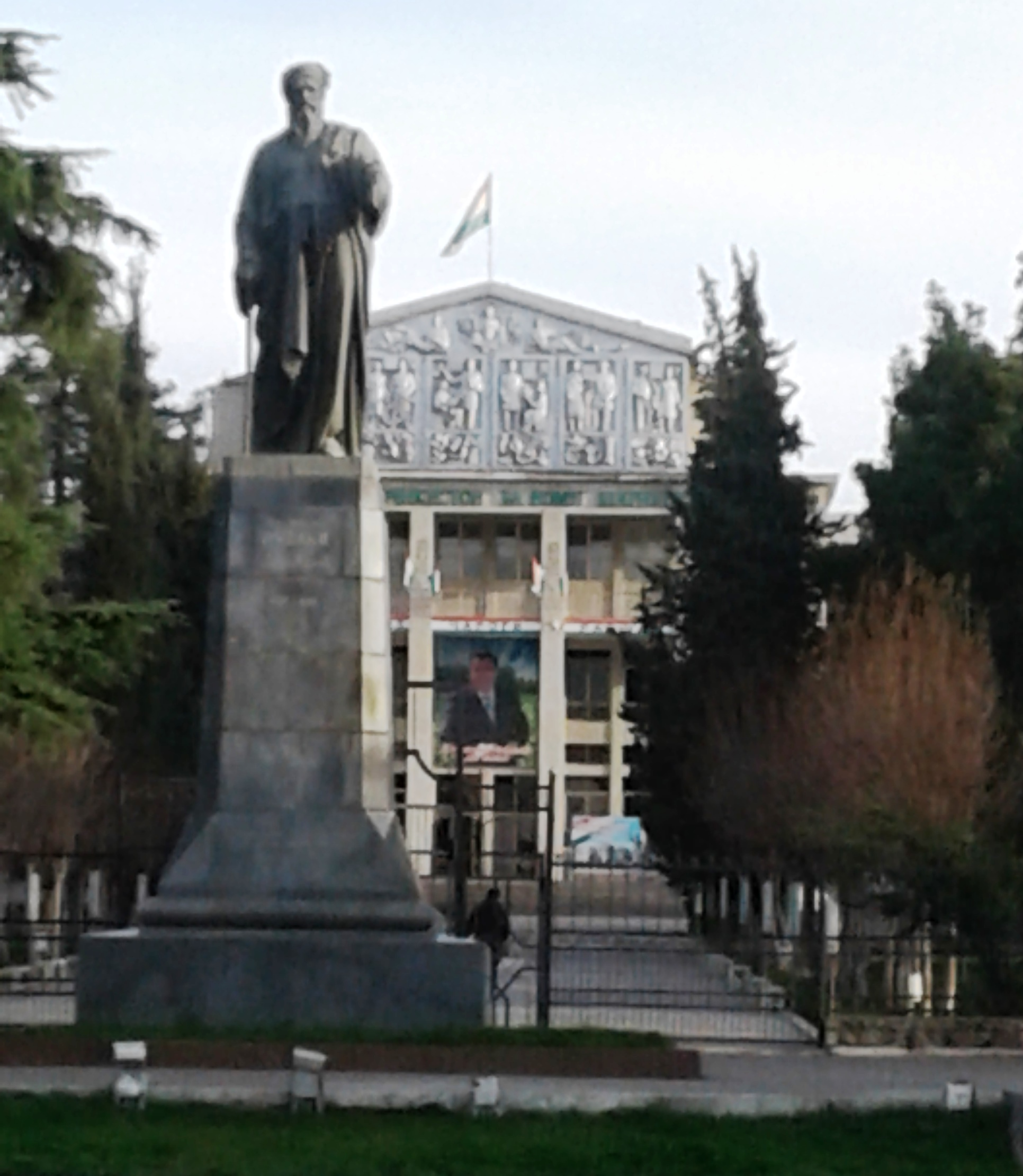
The Rudaki statue in front of the university.

Rudaki Square is located in the northern part of Dushanbe, on the axis of Rudaki Avenue in the area of the Agricultural University of Tajikistan. The main part of the square is the sculpture of Abuabdullo Rudaki, built in 1964 by two Azerbaijani sculptors. A pool with a fountain is arranged in front of the sculpture, embodying the eternal life of the beloved poet in the hearts of the Tajik people. Behind the sculpture is a building of the university. It was opened on the eve of the celebration of the 1000th birthday of Rudaki. In the late 1990s, a high iron fence appeared behind the sculpture, separating the territory of the university from the square.

=== Red Square ===
Red Square (not to be confused with Moscow's Red Square) was located on the site of a park at the intersection of Lakhuti and Red Partisans streets. During the Soviet era, parades and processions took place on the square on 1 May (International Workers' Day) and 7 November (October Revolution Day). The first military parade in Dushanbe (then Stalinabad) took place on Red Square on 7 November 1945, with the participation of the 201st Motor Rifle Division, and its constituent infantry units and military equipment (artillery, armored vehicles, tanks). On the podium installed on Red Square, there were typically representatives of the Communist Party of the Tajik SSR, among others. 1 May 1959 was the last year when a parade was held on Red Square. A public garden currently occupies the site of the square.

=== Kuibyshev Square ===
The Kuibyshev Square in Dushanbe is located on a small section of Rudaki Avenue from Ayni Square to Privokzalnaya Square, in the southern part of the left bank of Dushanbe. As it approaches the railway station, it ends with a sculpture of Valerian Kuybyshev on a high pedestal and a sculpture of a Tajik family at the foot of the sculpture. In the middle there is a cascade of pools and a fountain.

=== Victory Square ===
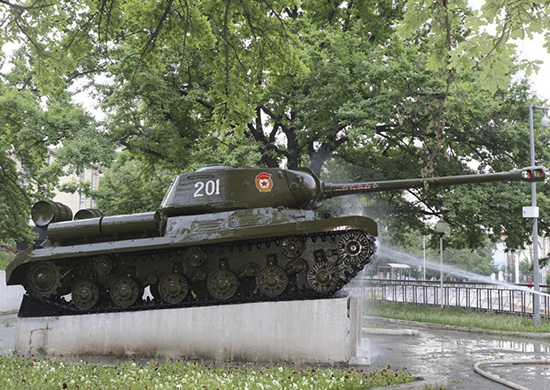
The IS-2 tank on Victory Square.

In 1944, funds were raised to create a tank column named after Tajikistan, which participated in the battles for the liberation of Yugoslavia, Hungary and Austria. In 1985, on Victory Square an IS-2 tank was erected, named after Joseph Stalin. The tank took part in the Vistula–Oder offensive as part of one of the units of the 2nd Belorussian Front. In April 2021, servicemen of the Russian military base in Tajikistan began the restoration of the monument.
