= Habibi =

Habibi or Habeebi may refer to:

== Literature ==
- Habibi (Nye novel), a 1997 young-adult novel by Naomi Shihab Nye
- Habibi (graphic novel), a 2011 graphic novel by Craig Thompson

== Music ==
- Habibi (band), an American band
- The Habibis, an Australian band
- Habibi, an album by Nura, 2019
- Hakol Over Habibi, known as Habibi, Israeli band

=== Songs ===
- "Habibi" (Ghali song), 2017
- "Habibi" (Ricky Rich and ARAM Mafia song), 2017
- "Habibi (I Need Your Love)", by Shaggy, Mohombi, Faydee, and Costi, 2014
- "Habibi", by Azis, 2015
- "Habibi", by Booba from Nero Nemesis, 2015
- "Habibi", by De Staat, 2009
- "Habibi", by Dolly Style during Melodifestivalen 2019
- "Habibi", by Maître Gims from Mon cœur avait raison, 2015
- "Habibi", by Now United, 2020
- "Habibi", by Rola Saad
- "Habibi", by System 7 from System 7, 1991
- "Habibi", by Tamino, 2017
- "Habibi (Je t'aime)", by Milk & Honey, 2006
- "Habibi (My Darling)", by Orange Blossom, 2005
- "Habibi (Sawah)", by Ishtar, 2009

== People ==
- Habibi (poet) (1470–1519/1520), Azerbaijani poet
- Habibi (surname)

== Other uses ==
- Habeebi (film), a 2026 Indian film
- Habibi (horse) (foaled 2009), a New Zealand Thoroughbred racehorse
- El Habibi Mosque, a mosque in Tunis, Tunisia
- Habibi Restaurant, a Lebanese, Middle Eastern, and Syrian restaurant in Portland, Oregon, US

== See also ==
- Habib / Habeeb, male name
- Habibie (surname)
- Habibti (disambiguation)
- Habibullah (disambiguation)
