= Sazoo =

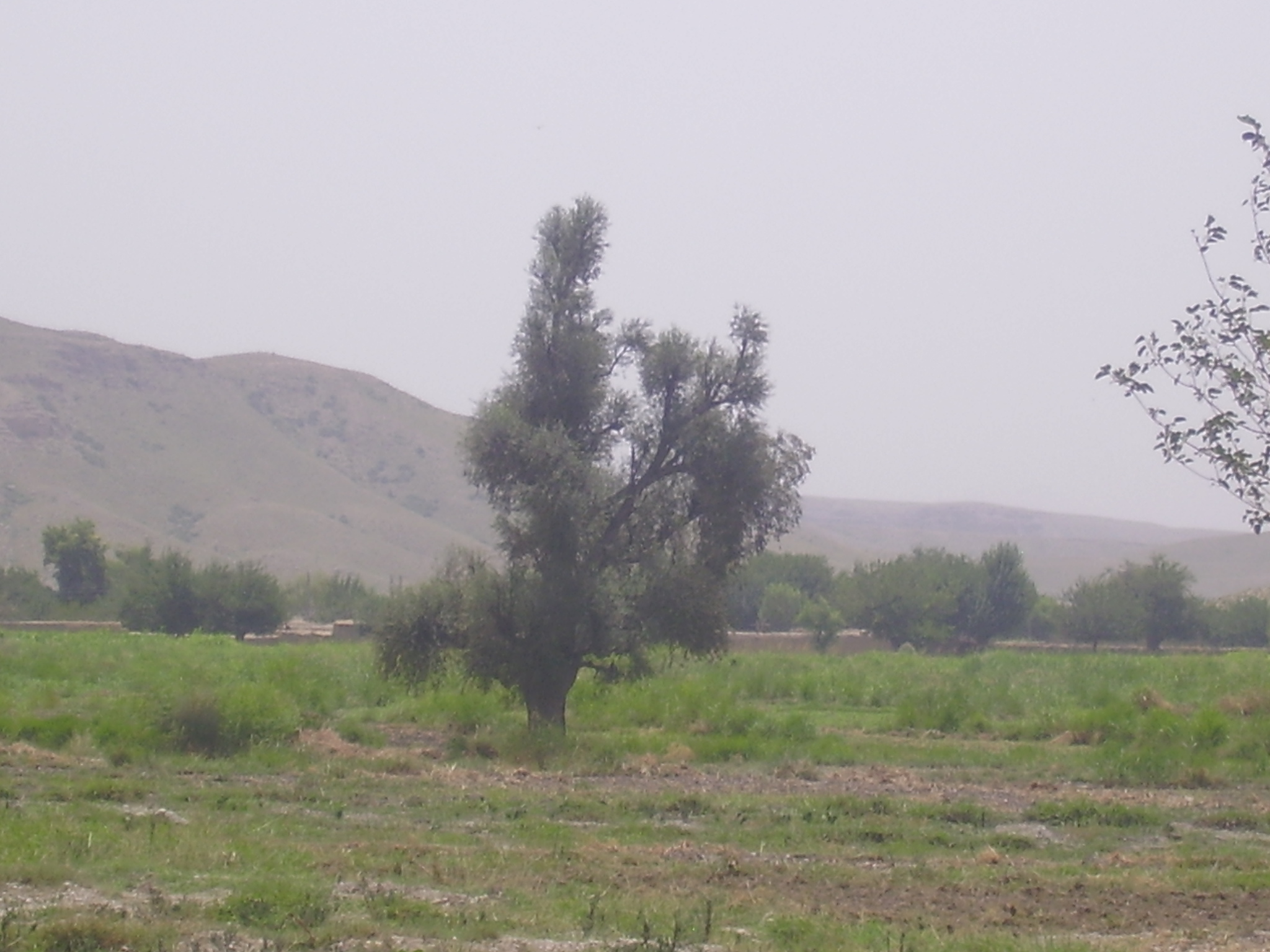
- Loi Shawan Killi Sazoo

- Location within Pakistan
- Coordinates: 30.189372°N 67.833806°E
- Country: Pakistan
- Province: Balochistan
- Time zone: UTC+5 (PST)

Killi Sazoo is an ancient village of the Harnai District in the Balochistan province of Pakistan.

The main tribes inhabiting it are the Tareen, Shedani, Bilalzai, Mir Hassanzai and Yusafzai. The main source of income is agriculture and basket and mat-making. Baskets and mats are made with a wild plant called marzi, which is in abundance in the nearby mountains.

Killi Sazoo is located such that Akhthari is at its east, Doom Khuchi at the west, Nakus or Nasuka at the south and the Sazoo Ghar is at the north. There are five sub-villages named Sar Waghara, Ghowaza, Sarka, Thuman and Khalifazai.
