= Habibullah =

Habibullah (Arabic: حَبِيْبَُ ٱلله) also spelled Habib Ullah, Habibollah, Habeeb-Allah, is a male Muslim given name meaning in Beloved of God, stemming from the male form of the name Habib. It may refer to:

== People named Habib Ullah ==
- Habib Ullah Khan (politician) (1935–2023), Bangladeshi minister and diplomat
- Noor Habib Ullah (born 1980), Afghan held in Guantanamo
- Mohammad Habib Ullah, Bangladesh Army general

== People named Habiballah ==
- Habiballah Dahamardeh, Iranian politician
- Habiballah Esmaili, Iranian historian
- Habiballah Mehman-Navaz, Iranian Shia cleric

== People named Habibollah ==
=== Given name of Habibollah ===
- Habibollah Akhlaghi (born 1987), Iranian wrestler
- Habibollah Asgaroladi (1933–2013), Iranian politician
- Habibollah Badiee (1933–1992), Iranian musician and composer
- Habibollah Bitaraf (born 1956), Iranian reformist politician
- Habibollah Hedayat (1917–2013), Iranian nutrition scientist
- Habibollah Latifi, Iranian Kurdish political activist
- Habibollah Peyman (born 1935), Iranian politician

=== Surname of Habibollah ===
- Hasbi Habibollah (born 1963), Malaysian politician

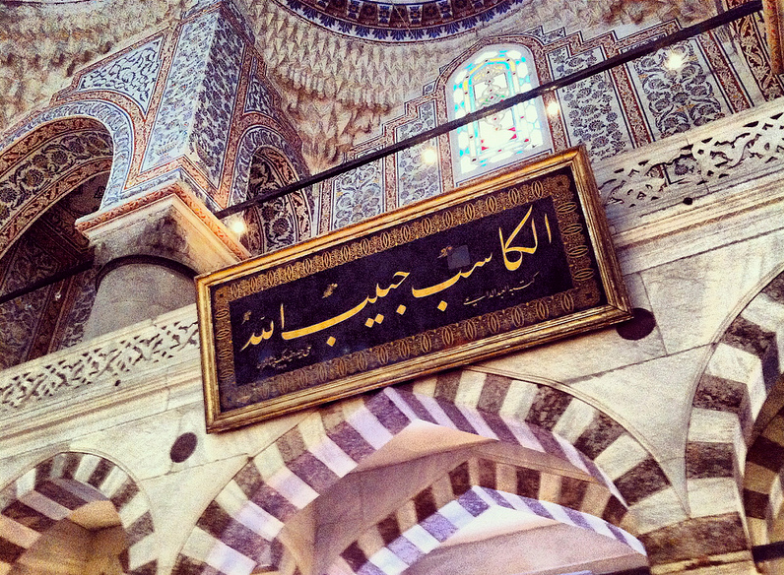
"The hard worker ("earner, gainer") is Most Loved of Allah" (Arabic: al-kāsib Ḥabib Allah الكَسِب حَبِيب الله), atop an arch in a mosque in Istanbul, Turkey

== People named Habibullah ==
=== Given name of Habibullah ===
- Habibullah (Bagram detainee) (died 2002), Afghan who died in US custody
- Habibullah Bahar Chowdhury (1906–1966), politician and writer from East Bengal
- Kabibulla Dzhakupov (born 1949), Kazakh Politician
- Habibullah Jan (died 2008), Afghan politician
- Habibullah Karzai, Afghan politician
- Habibullah Khan (1872–1919), King/Emir of Afghanistan
- Habibullah Khan Khattak (1913–1994), Pakistani military officer
- Habibullah Khan Marwat (1901–1978), acting Prime Minister of Pakistan and High Court judge
- Habibullah Khan Tarin (born 1947), Pakistan army officer
- Habibullah Khan Tarzi (born 1896), Afghan diplomat
- Habibullāh Kalakāni (ca. 1890–1929), Emir of Afghanistan
- Habibullah Qaderi (born 1961), Afghan politician
- Habibullah Qurayshi (1865–1943), Bengali Islamic scholar

=== Surname of Habibullah ===
- Amir Habibullah Khan Saadi (1909–1989), Indian freedom fighter and Pakistani politician
- Enaith Habibullah (1910–1990), Indian Army General Officer
- Khalid Mobarak Habeeb-Allah Alqurashi (died 2004), Saudi alleged terrorist
- Khan Habibullah Khan (1901–1978), Pakistani politician and High Court judge
- Khwaja Habibullah (1895–1958), Nawab of Dhaka
- Muhammad Habibullah (1869–1948), Indian nobleman and statesman
- Raja Sir Chulan ibni Almarhum Sultan Abdullah Muhammad Shah Habibullah, known as Raja Chulan (1869–1933), member of the Perak royal family (Malaya)

== See also ==
- Amadeus (name)
- Habib
- Habibi (disambiguation)
- Khabibullaev
- Khabibullin
