= Begum Mahmooda Salim Khan =

Pakistani politician

- بیگم محمودہ سلیم خان
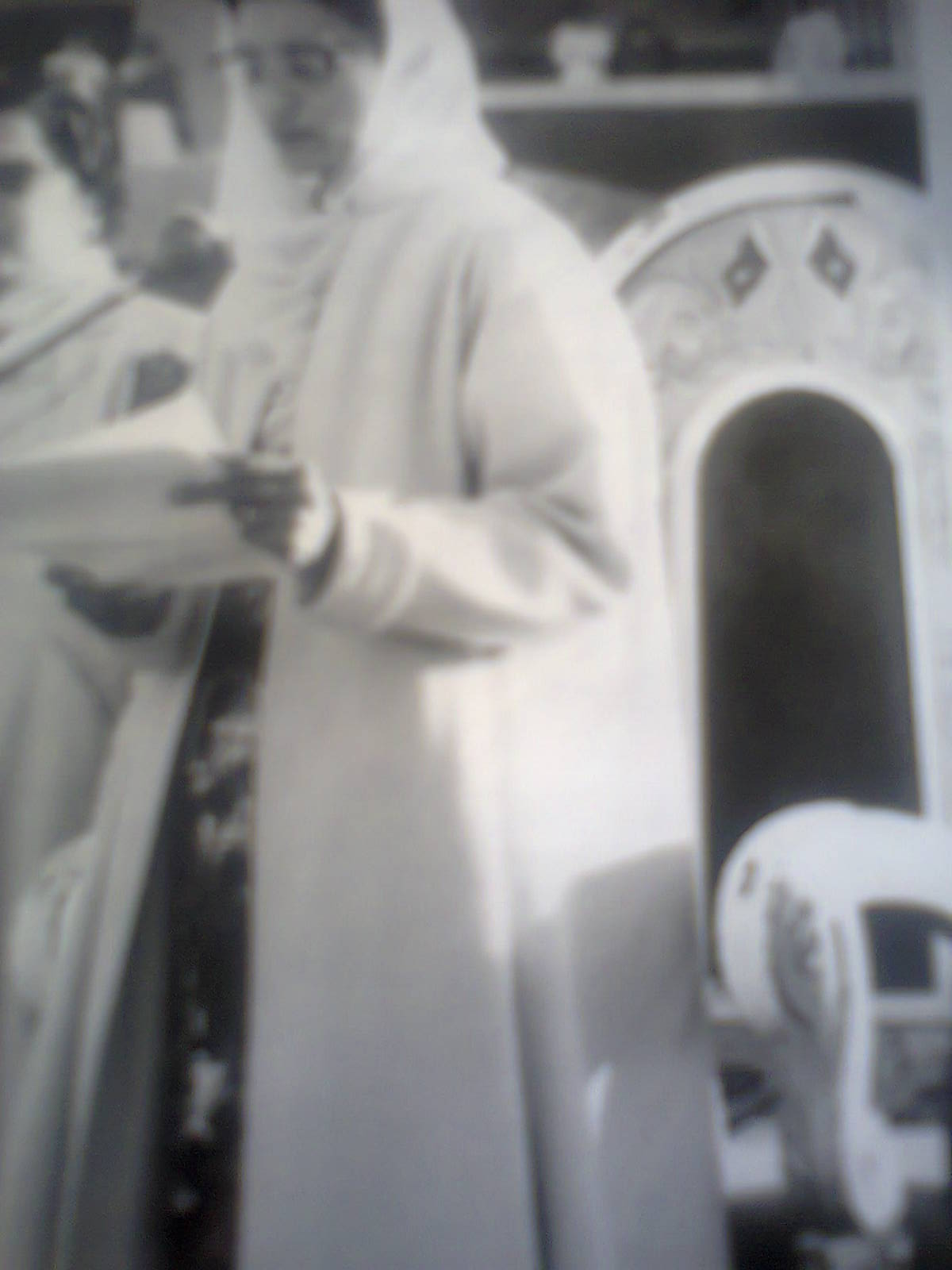
- Khan speaking at the opening of a new science block at a public school, Lahore, 1962

Minister of Education
- In office 1962–1967
- President: Muhammad Ayub Khan

Personal details
- Born: May 1913 Amritsar, Punjab, British India
- Died: June 2007 (aged 94) Abbottabad, North-West Frontier Province, Pakistan
- Spouse: Abdus Salim Khan (m. 1934; died 1957)
- Parent: Sikandar Hayat Khan (father)

Begum Mahmooda Salim Khan (Urdu: بیگم محمودہ سلیم خان; May 1913 – June 2007) was a Pakistani social worker, early political figure and a cabinet minister in West Pakistan for education during President Ayub Khan's regime.

== Background ==
Begum Salim Khan was born in 1913, at Amritsar, Punjab, then British India. She was the eldest daughter of the renowned Unionist Party statesman, Sir Sikandar Hayat Khan of Wah from his first wife, Begum Zubaida Khanum.

After her mother's death in 1919, she was raised by her aunt and educated at Aligarh School for Muslim Women and Queen Mary's College, Lahore.

In 1934, she was married to Abdus Salim Khan a Civil Servant from Talokar Haripur. who was the eldest son of an aristocrat Abdul Majid Khan Tarin, OBE. Her husband served the Government of British India and later the diplomatic service of the newly created state of Pakistan from 1947 onwards.

In initial years of her married life she focused primarily on looking after household and raising her children like any Pakistani housewife. However, she gradually, involved herself in helping the people through welfare activities, and got socially more active. Her endeavors in this regard were multifaceted and added much to the benefit of the Pakistani society.

== Philanthropy ==
On her husband's death in 1957, Begum Salim Khan moved to the town of Abbottabad, Pakistan, where she became increasingly involved in various social and charitable works over the years, in close collaboration with other well-known women social workers such as Lady Viqar un Nisa Noon, Begum Zari Sarfaraz, Begum Kulsum Saifullah Khan, Attiya Inayatullah and Shaista Suhrawardy Ikramullah; and also was Chief Executive of organizations such as the Family Planning Association of Pakistan, Pakistan Red Crescent Society, Lok Virsa Museum, National Crafts Council of Pakistan, Anti TB Association of Pakistan, the SOS Children's Villages, Pakistan and others. She remained patron-president of the National Youth Council of Pakistan and received the Adelaide Ristori Award, Italy, in 1980, for her work in promoting cultural activities among Pakistani youth. She also received several other national and international awards for social welfare activities.

== Political career ==
Back in 1960s, she was sworn in as the first ever woman Provincial Minister in West Pakistan's Cabinet, during General Ayub Khan government, as Minister of Education in 1962-1967. But her stay in politics was brief and she resumed her welfare activities which she continued till her demise.

She had passion for gardening and was very fond of flowers. She died peacefully at her home in Abbottabad, Pakistan, in 2007, at the age of 94 years.
