= State Flag Day (Tajikistan) =

Holiday in Tajikistan

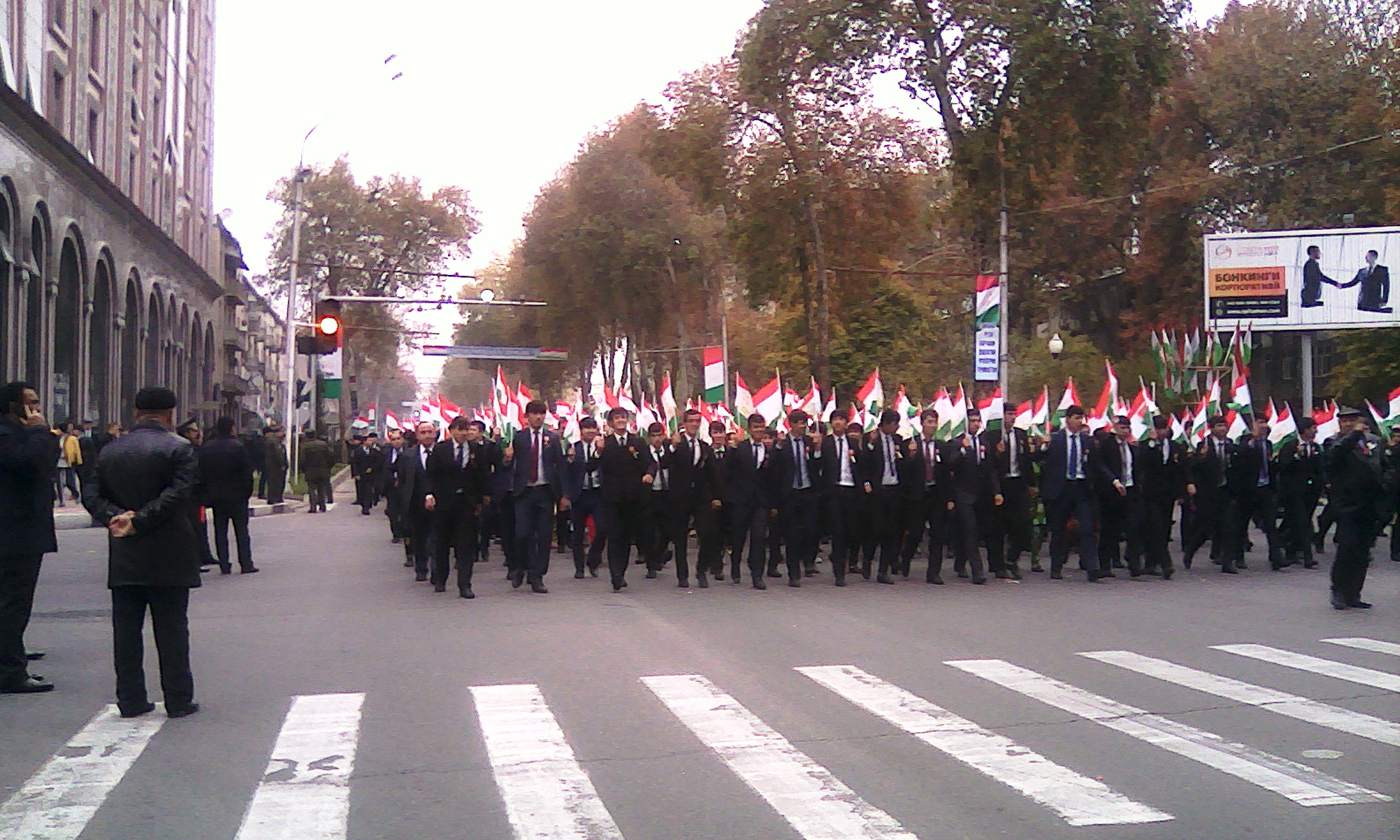
- A State Flag Day procession in Dushanbe in 2015
- Official name: Tajik: Рӯзи Парчами давлатии Ҷумҳурии Тоҷикистон; Russian: День Государственного флага Таджикистана
- Observed by: Tajikistan
- Date: 24 November
- Next time: 24 November 2026
- Frequency: Annual

The Day of the State Flag of Tajikistan (Tajik: Рӯзи Парчами давлатии Ҷумҳурии Тоҷикистон; Russian: День Государственного флага Таджикистана) is an official working holiday in Tajikistan. Established in 2009, it is observed annually on 24 November to commemorate the adoption of the Flag of Tajikistan on 24 November 1992.

It is one of several observances related to Tajik statehood held during November. Constitution Day, observed on 6 November, is a public holiday celebrating the adoption of the founding constitution in 1994. President's Day, observed on 16 November, is a working holiday commemorating the election of President Emomali Rahmon as Chairman of Supreme Soviet of the Tajik Soviet Socialist Republic (Tajik SSR) in 1992.

== History ==
Following Tajikistan's independence from the Soviet Union in 1991, the country became embroiled in a civil war. During the same period, efforts were undertaken to establish national symbols for the newly independent state. A competition to design a new national flag, emblem and anthem was launched on 12 November 1991. By 1992, fighting had intensified, prompting the Supreme Soviet of Tajik SSR to relocate from Dushanbe to Khujand for its 16th session. During the session, the winning design, created by Zuhur Habibulloev and Mahmadullo Saydaliev, was formally adopted as the national flag on 24 November 1992.

In the week preceding 24 November 2009, both chambers of the bicameral Supreme Assembly of Tajikistan adopted amendments to the law "On Holidays". President Emomali Rahmon subsequently signed the legislation establishing the State Flag Day as an annual working holiday commemorating the adoption of the national flag. Tajikistan became the second Central Asian country, after Turkmenistan, to establish an official observance dedicated to its national flag.

The inaugural celebrations were held on 24 November 2009. In Dushanbe, approximately 300 students marched along one of the city's main streets carrying a 90m long national flag. 22 runners also completed a multiday relay covering more than a hundred kilometres across Tajikistan, beginning in the town of Regar, near the Tajik-Uzbek border, and concluding at the site of the current Roghun Hydropower Station.

== Commemorations ==
State Flag Day is marked by various cultural, educational and ceremonial activities across Tajikistan. In Dushanbe, the principal celebrations include a flag raising ceremony at the National Flag Monument, whose 165m flagpole was the tallest in the world when it was completed in 2011 until 2014. Elsewhere in the country, commemorations include parades, rallies, exhibitions, concerts, sporting events and activities organised by educational institutions. The events are intended to promote awareness of the history and significance of the national flag, and strengthen national identity. Residents also commonly display the national flag at their houses to mark the occasion.

== See also ==
- Public holidays in Tajikistan
