= Khabibullaev =

Habibullaev or Khabibullaev, feminine: Habibullaeva or Khabibullaeva is a Russian-language masculine patronymic surname derived from the given name Habibullah with the Russian patronymic suffix -ev. The surname originates in Central Asia, which was part of the Russian Empire and Soviet Union. Notable people with the surname include:

- Asliddin Khabibullaev
- Diyorakhon Khabibullaeva
- Poʻlat Habibullayev
- Turabek Khabibullaev
- Zuhur Habibullaev

== See also ==
- Khabibulin
