= Emblem of the Tajik Soviet Socialist Republic =

- Armiger: Tajik Soviet Socialist Republic
- Adopted: 1 March 1937
- Shield: Rising sun, red star, and hammer and sickle
- Supporters: Cotton and Wheat
- Motto: «Пролетарҳои ҳамаи мамлакатҳо, як шавед!» (Tajik) «Пролетарии всех стран, соединяйтесь!» (Russian) "Workers of the world, unite!"
- Other elements: a wreath composed, on the right, the ears of grain and, on the left, the stems of cotton, and below, a vine tree
- Earlier version
- Use: 1936

The State Emblem of the Tajik Soviet Socialist Republic was adopted on 1 March 1937 by the government of the Tajik Soviet Socialist Republic. The emblem is based on the State Emblem of the Soviet Union. It shows symbols of agriculture (cotton and wheat). The red star is prominently featured with a small hammer and sickle within it. The rising sun stands for the future of the Tajik nation, and the star as well as the hammer and sickle for the victory of communism and the "world-wide socialist community of states". The emblem was replaced with the new emblem in 1992, which uses a similar design to the Soviet one. It was, however, was replacing the red banner with the current national flag, the big red star was replaced by the mountains, represents Pamir, the Samanid dynasty crown, and added the Quran book at below. It represents Islam as the official religion.

The banner bears the Soviet Union state motto ("Workers of the world, unite!") in both the Tajik and Russian languages. In Tajik, it is «Пролетарҳои ҳамаи мамлакатҳо, як шавед!» (Proletarhoji hamaji mamlakatho, jak şaved!).

The name of the republic is also shown in both Tajik and Russian. The final form of the emblem was designed by painter Alexander Semyonovich Yakovlev.

== History ==
=== Tajik ASSR ===
In accordance with the decree of the Presidium of the CEC of the Tajik ASSR, dated 23 February 1929,

State coat of arms of Tajik ASSR consisted of gold dosa (Tajik hammer) and hammer placed crosswise arms downward and located in the Golden rays of the sun, surrounded by a wreath of wheat ears on the right and a branch of cotton with opened bolls on the left on an orange background. Below the inscription in Russian: "Proletarians of all countries, unite!". Above the inscription in Tajik language on the Persian letter "Proletarians of all countries, unite!"

In accordance with article 105 of the 1929 Constitution of the Tajik ASSR,

The national emblem of the Tajik Soviet socialist Republic consisted of a dosa (similar to hammer) and hammer in gold laid crosswise arms downward and located on a five-pointed star in the blue sky lit by the Golden rays of the Golden sun rising from behind snow-covered mountains. The star is surrounded by a crown of wheat ears on the right and a branch of cotton with open bolls left on orange background. At the bottom of the wreath ribbon red (scarlet) color. Under the star is the inscription in Russian: "Proletarians of all countries, unite!". On top of the star an inscription in Tajik Persian the Tajik Latin letter: "Proletarians of all countries, unite!". The internal image of the coat of arms surrounded by a gold ribbon in the form of a Crescent, horns up. Three inscriptions are arranged one above the other on the tape: the letter in Persian, Tajik ASSR and the letter in Russian: "the Tajik Autonomous Soviet socialist Republic". All these three inscriptions are arranged in a semicircle on a gold ribbon in the shape of a Crescent.

Coat of Arms of Tajik Autonomous Soviet Socialist Republic 1924–04.1929 (as Tajik ASSR)

Coat of Arms of Tajik Autonomous Soviet Socialist Republic 04.1929-24.02.1931 (as Tajik ASSR)

=== Tajik SSR ===
According to the Constitution of the Tajik SSR, adopted on 24 February 1931 4th Congress of Soviets of the Tajik SSR:

The coat of arms consisted of an image of a five-pointed star, the top of which were placed the hammer and sickle in the rays of the sun, and in the lower part: a factory building near the mountain slopes, a railway bridge, a flock of sheep, a tractor, a locomotive. Star framed by a wreath of ears of wheat (right), twigs of cotton (left) and grapes (bottom), a wreath was intertwined by ribbon with the motto "Proletarians of all countries, unite!" In the lower sector of the circle were placed the words "Tajik SSR" in Tajik Latin, Persian, and Russian languages.

According to the Constitution, adopted by V Congress of Soviets in January 1935, coat of arms remained unchanged, only the name of the Republic became abbreviated as "the Tajik SSR". On 27 June 1935, the Presidium of the CEC of the Tajik SSR invited the artist Alexander Yakovlev S. to Refine your project of the emblem (project A. S. Yakovlev took 1st place in the competition, 1934).

On 4 July 1935, a revised draft was approved by the Presidium of the CEC of the Tajik SSR. Later on 27 April 1936, this draft was approved by the Decree of the CEC of the Tajik SSR. Description of this emblem:

A wreath of wheat ears on the right and twigs of cotton balls on the left bottom in the place of the intertwining branches of cotton and ears of corn were placed hammer and sickle surrounded by brush and vine leaves; in the middle of the sickle – silk cocoons; the wreath is intertwined with red ribbon with the motto "Proletarians of all countries, unite!" in Tajik (left) and Russian (right); inside the wreath from the bottom up were the tractor, two sheep, arable land, canal, building hydro power stations with a red flag on it, trees, village, neftevyshka, mountains; over the mountains the sun rises, the rays of which is placed the inscription "Tajik SSR" in the Tajik language; between the ends of the wreath - red five-pointed star.

On 27 April 1936, the Presidium of the CEC of the Tajik SSR adopted the resolution "On approval of the description of the State emblem of the Tajik Soviet socialist Republic". On 26 May 1936, the fourth session of the CEC of the Tajik SSR of the fifth convocation adopted the images and descriptions of the coat of arms and flag and made these descriptions in article 92 and 93 of the Constitution of the Tajik SSR.

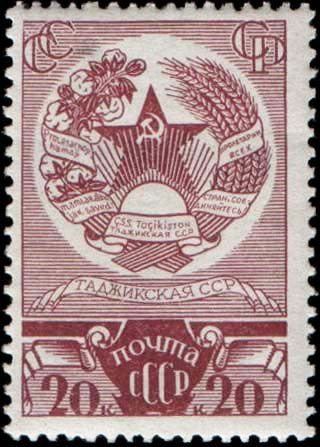
Emblem of the Tajik SSR on a 1937 postage stamp

According to the Constitution, adopted during VI Extraordinary Congress of Soviets on 1 March 1937, the emblem has been greatly simplified: in the centre of the coat of arms in the Golden rays of the sun depicted a red five-pointed star, the top of which were placed the Golden hammer and sickle. All framed by a garland of ears of wheat (right) and branches of cotton with opened bolls (left). Wreath twined the red ribbon with inscriptions in Tajik and Russian languages: "Proletarians of all countries, unite!" and "Tajik SSR"(at the base of the wreath).

On the basis of the constitutional descriptions of the preparation of the images of the emblem and flag. On 19 May 1937, the Presidium of the CEC of the Tajik SSR has considered the figures of the coat of arms and flag of the Republic and recommended to do the motto on the coat of arms of gold, to make the background of the emblem and leaves of cotton light green, hammer and sickle on the star to represent gold.

On 20 May 1937, the Presidium of the CEC of the Tajik SSR had reviewed the draft drawings of the coat of arms and flag, adopted a decree "About the State emblem and flag of the Tajik SSR". This resolution was finally approved with some changes, the Motto "Proletarians of all countries, unite!" was recommended to write in gold, the background and the leaves of cotton to pale green, the sickle and the hammer of gold, the rays of the sun to place on the circumference. On 23 May 1937, the Presidium of the CEC approved the coat of arms. According to established in 1937 as a Commission under the Presidium of the Supreme Soviet of the translation of the motto "Proletarians of all countries, unite!" in the Tajik language was made accurately.

In 1938, the word Çumhurijat was replaced with Respublika, resulting in the inscription on the emblem took the form of "RSS Tocikiston". Later on 28 September 1940, the Presidium of the Supreme Soviet of the Tajik SSR issued a decree who changed the spelling of the texts of the inscriptions on the flag and coat of arms from Latin alphabet to Cyrillic. Later, in the 1978 Constitution of the Tajik SSR, description of the coat of arms has not changed. The official description of the coat of arms in the text of the Constitution:

"Article 131. The national emblem of the Tajik Soviet Socialist Republic consists of the image of a five-pointed star, the top of which depicts a hammer and sickle in the rays of the sun. Five-pointed star framed by a wreath composed on the right from ears of wheat, left Yves branches of cotton with opened bolls. From above a wreath is a ribbon with the inscription: "Proletarians of all countries, unite!" in Tajik and Russian languages. In the lower sector of the circle formed by the crown, the ribbon with the inscription "Tajik SSR" in Tajik and Russian languages".

The emblem was changed in 1992 to the present Emblem of Tajikistan, which uses a design similar to the different Soviet symbols.

The coat of arms of the Tajik Soviet Socialist Republic (24.02.1931 – 04.07.1935)

Emblem of the Tajik Soviet Socialist Republic (1936)

The coat of arms of the Tajik Soviet Socialist Republic (in Latin alphabet) (27.04.1935 – 20.05. 1937)

The coat of arms of the Tajik Soviet Socialist Republic (in Latin alphabet) (1938 – 28.09.1940)

Emblem of the Tajik Soviet Socialist Republic (in Cyrillic) (1940–1991) and the Republic of Tajikistan (1991–1992)

== See also ==
- Flag of the Tajik Soviet Socialist Republic
- Flag of Tajikistan
- Emblem of Tajikistan
