= Talokar =

Pakistani village

Coordinates: 33.984°N 72.942°E

Talokar is a village located in the khushab district of Talokar, Punjab, Pakistan.

== Demographics ==
The population of Talokar, according to 2017 census was 8,250.

== History ==
Talokar was founded during the 12th or 13th century AD by the Talokar is khoker awan but in the 17th century became part of Dheri-Talokar, a feudal estate of a prominent family of Tarin.

The best-known members of this family include the late Muhammad Habib Khan Tarin, Risaldar, CSI; Khan Sahib Abdul Majid Khan Tarin, OBE, Barrister, Khan Sahib H.E Abdus Salim Khan, former ambassador and Omer Salim Khan (Omer Tarin) the poet, mystic and scholar.

== Role in World War I ==
In World War I Talokar and its nearby (smaller) villages (now in Pakistan) made a big contribution of soldiers to the British Indian Army at that time, around 240 men; the village in all of British India with the highest number was Dulmial in Chakwal District of Punjab. Among those people from here who died in action in the Great War, were Jemadar Abdul Latif Khan, IDSM of the 82nd Punjabis, Sowar Ghulam Jan Khan of the 11th Cavalry seconded to Central Indian Horse and Sepoy Sikandar Khan of the 82nd Punjabis, attached to the 58th Vaughan's Rifles (Frontier Force). A total of 18 people from here are supposed to have died in the War.

== Further information ==
The approximate population of the main Talokar village as per 2001 Census was about 4800. Talokar also has 2 small nearby hamlets, which are generally classed along with it, and they had an additional population of 1260, in 2000–2001. It is primarily an agrarian area, despite its proximity to Haripur town (approx. 2 km) and is well known for its fine vegetables, wheat and maize crops and orchards of loquats, oranges and other fruits. Although the majority of the residents are engaged in farming activities, a fairly large number are also in government and military service and some few work in local industries, or work abroad as immigrant labour.

The main tribes and ethnic groups here are Awans, Maliars, various Pashtuns (like Tareen, Dilazak, Alizai and Tanoli), Syeds, Gujars, Bhatti Rajputs, and some others. In terms of religious practices, the population is overwhelmingly Muslim, mostly of the Sunni persuasion. The general level of literacy/education is quite high by Pakistani standards, with schooling for both boys and girls available and, by and large, Talokar is a prosperous, law-abiding and peaceful community, although, in common with the clannish culture of the region, occasional outbursts of violence are evident. Among popular pastimes here are hunting, horse riding, the traditional martial art of Gatka and Kumbhar folk-dancing.
