= Darwesh =

Coordinates: 33°59′26″N 72°55′5″E

- Town and union council
- Interactive map of Darwesh
- Country: Pakistan
- Region: Khyber Pakhtunkhwa
- District: Haripur District
- Time zone: UTC+5 (PST)

Darwesh (Urdu: درویش) is a village and one of the 44 union councils, administrative subdivisions, of Haripur District in the Khyber Pakhtunkhwa province of Pakistan. It is located south of the district capital, Haripur, at 33°59'26N 72°55'5E.

Darwesh village is home to a branch of the famous Tareen family of Hazara region, The best-known member of this is ex-Speaker of the NWFP (KPK) Assembly, Major (retd) Habibullah Khan Tareen.
