= Souk El Ouzar =

Coordinates: 36.798637°N 10.172637°E

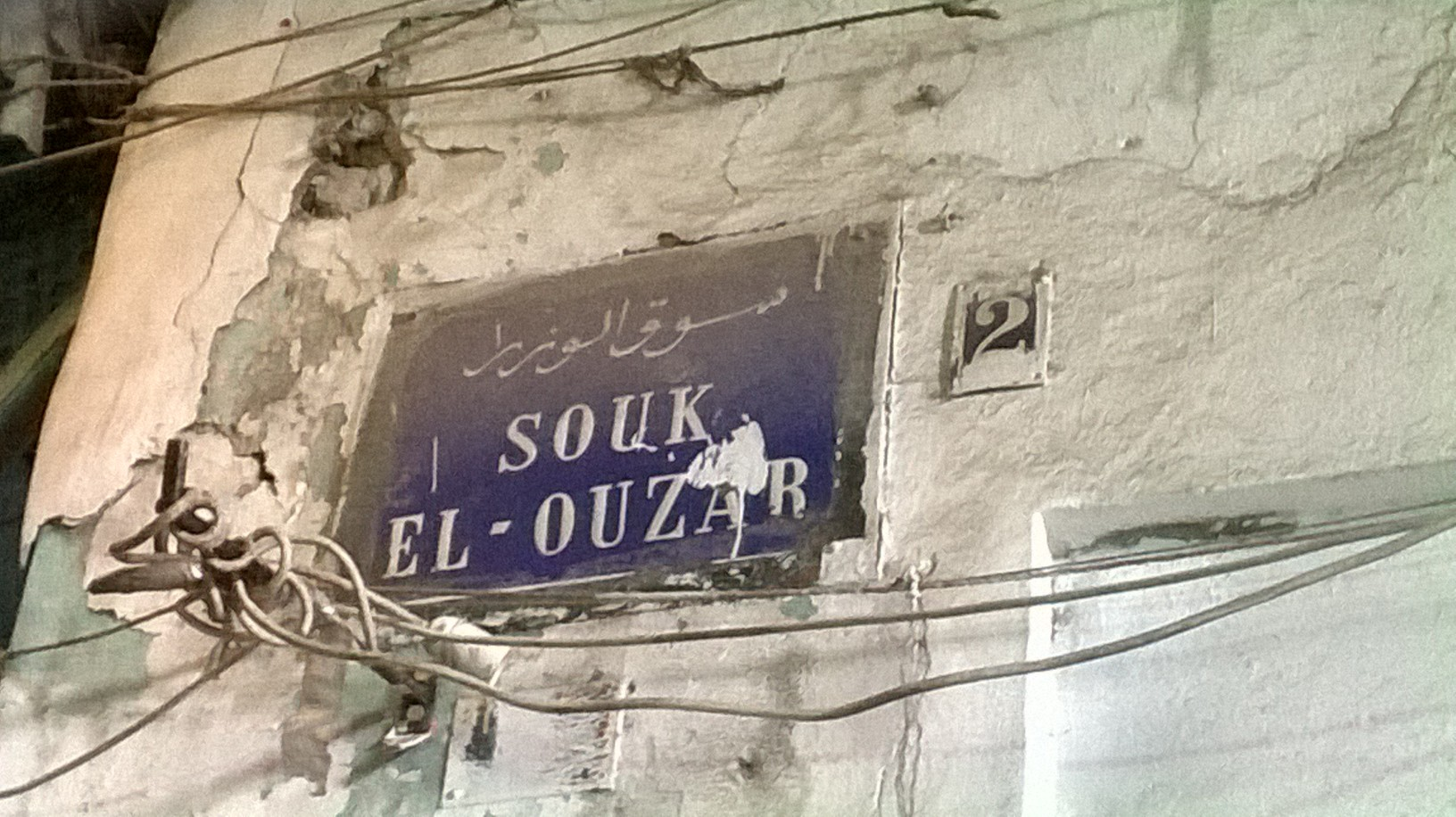
Metallic plaque of Souk El Ouzar

Souk El Ouzar is one of the souks of the medina of Tunis, specialized in selling blankets.

== Location ==
It is located in the north-east of Al-Zaytuna Mosque, near Souk El Attarine.

== Monuments ==
The souk has many monuments like Eshobak mosque and El Habibi Mosque that was built by the husainid ruler Muhammad VI al-Habib.

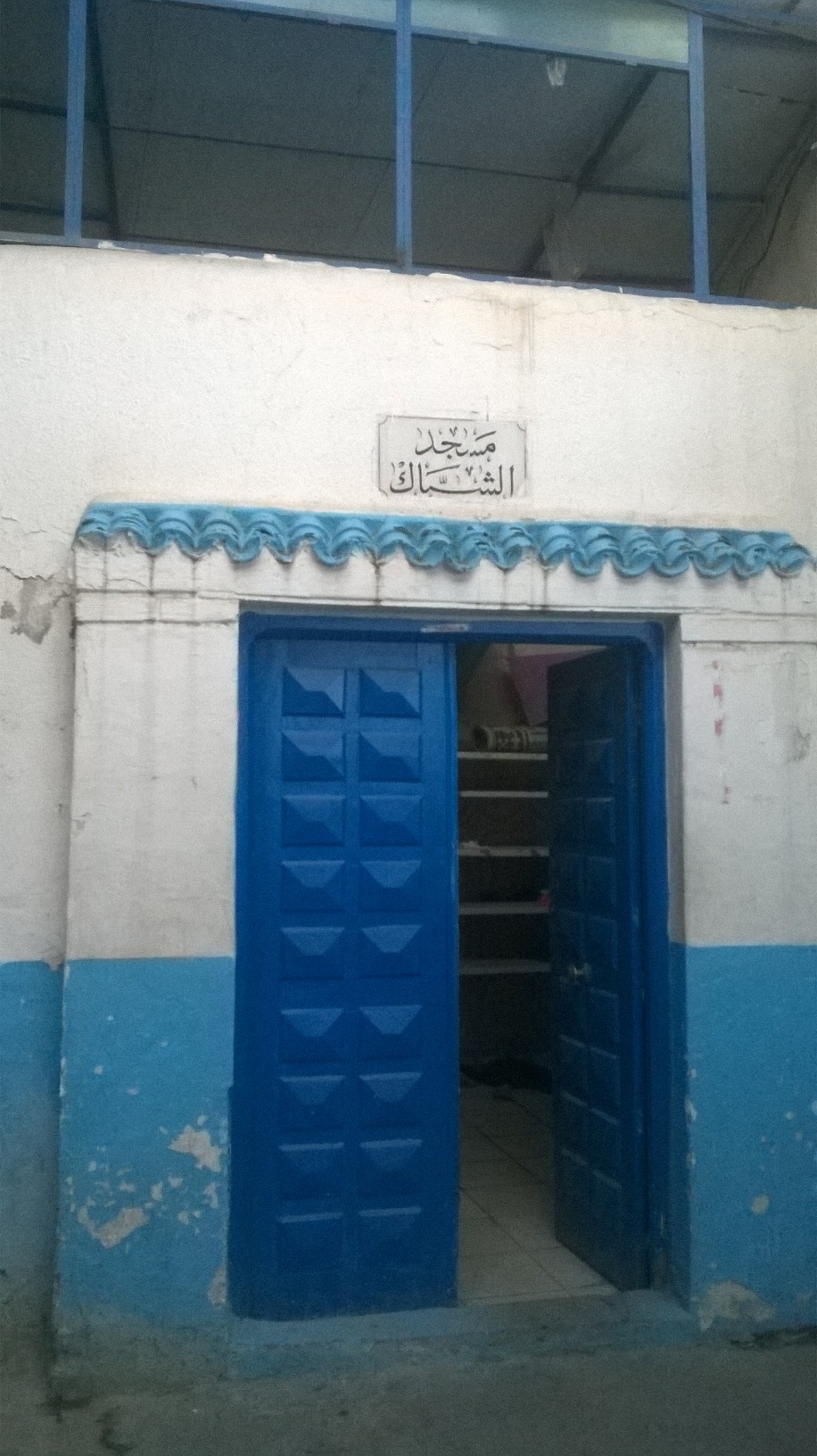
Eshobak Mosque

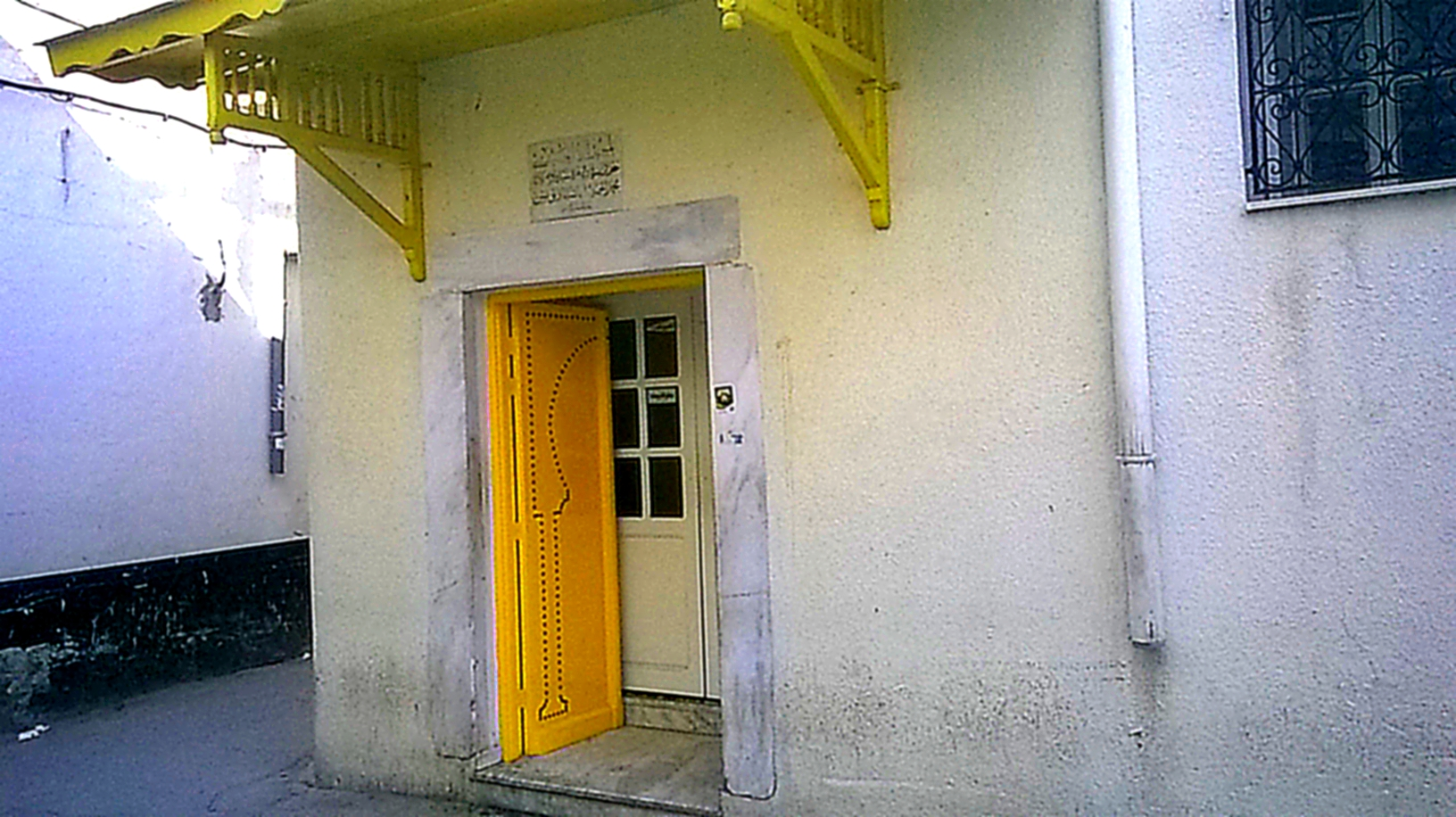
El Habibi Mosque

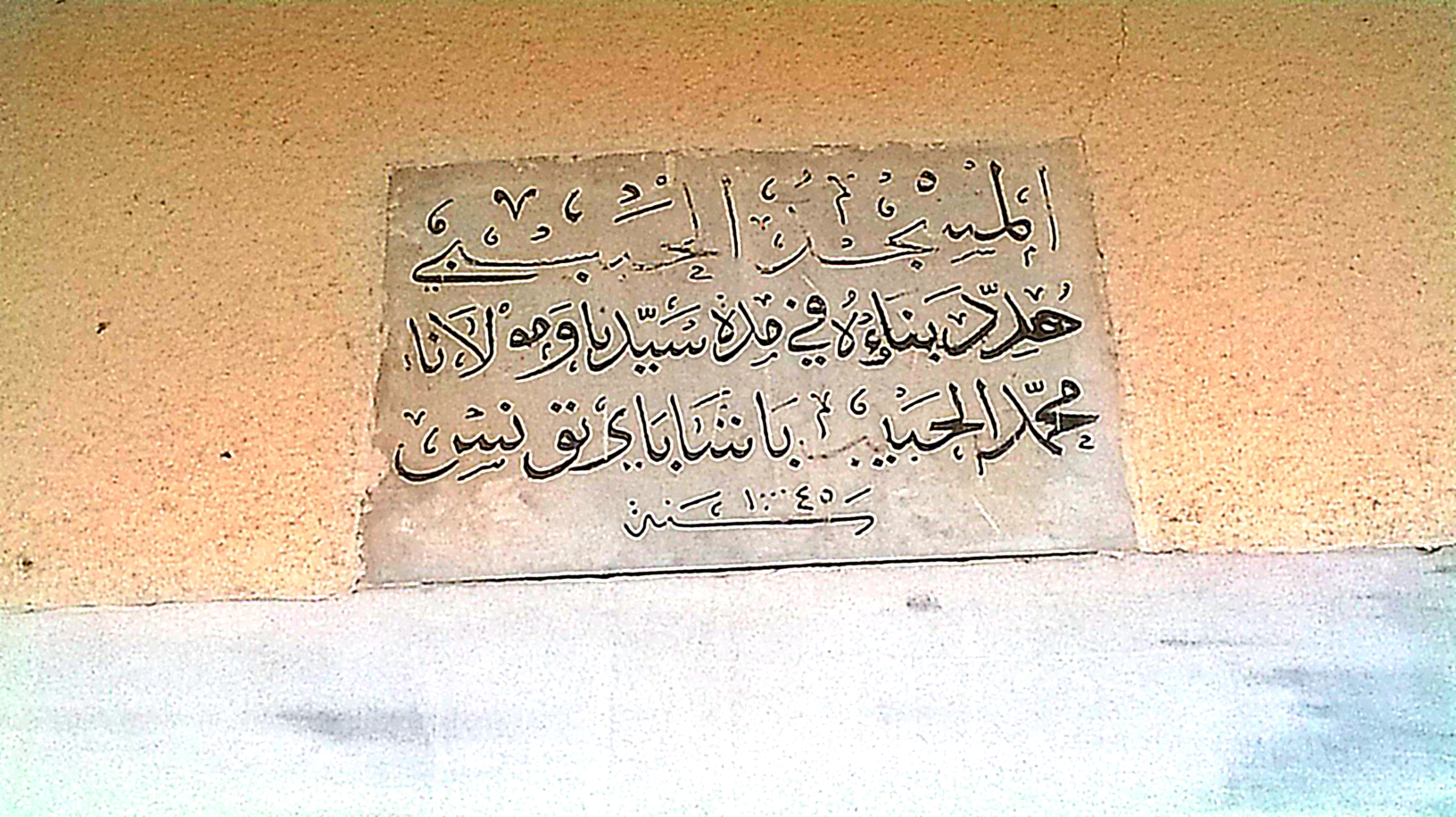
Commemorative plaque of El Habibi Mosque
