= Awans =

Municipality in Liège Province, Wallonia, Belgium

Awans Awan (Walloon)
- Municipality
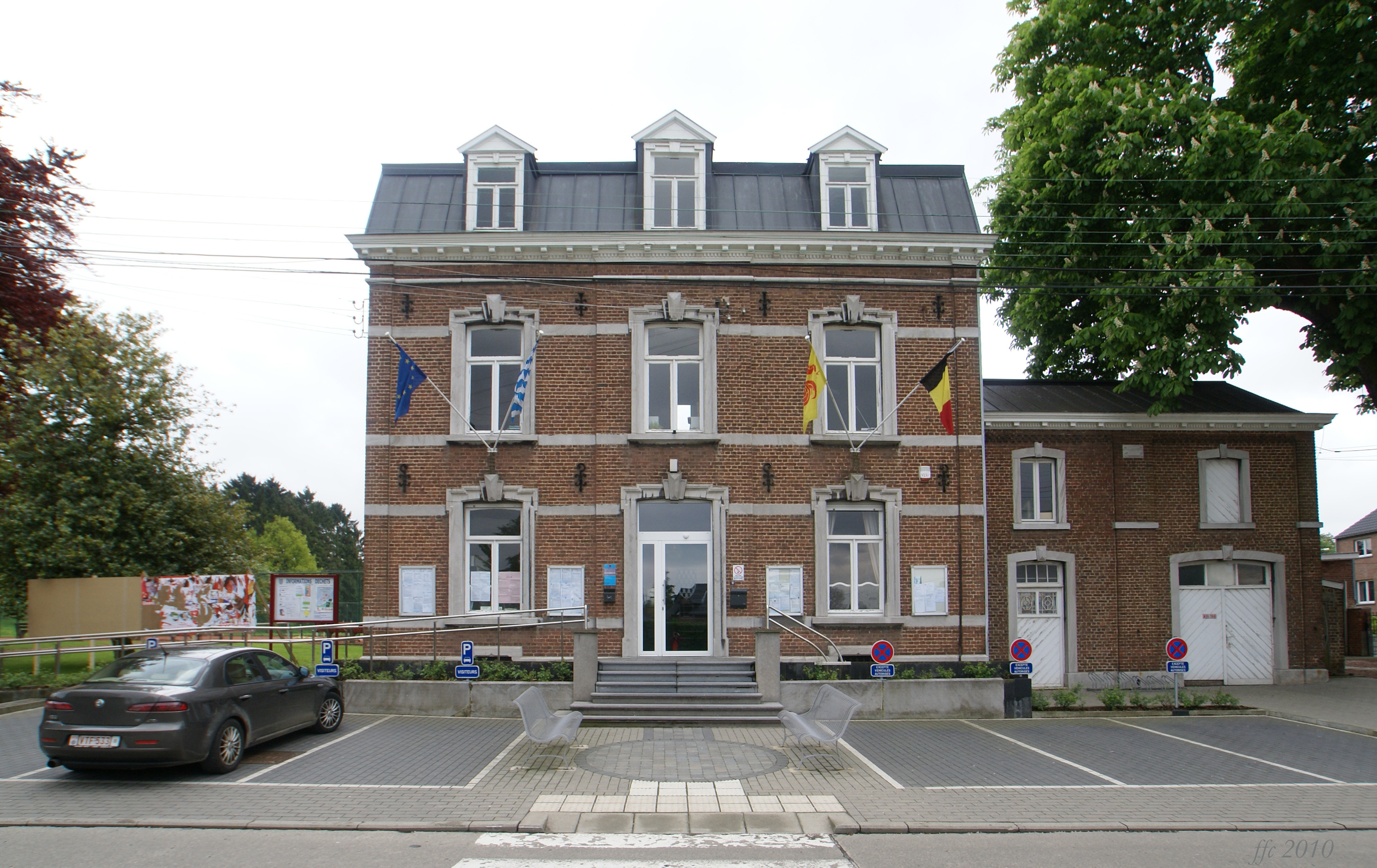
- Awans town hall

- Flag Coat of arms

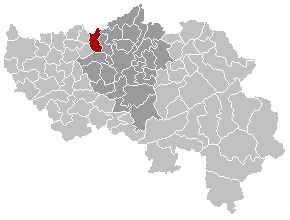
- Location of Awans in Liège province
- Interactive map of Awans
- Location in Belgium
- Coordinates: 50°40′N 05°28′E
- Country: Belgium
- Community: French Community
- Region: Wallonia
- Province: Liège
- Arrondissement: Liège

Government
  - Mayor: Thibaud Smolders (PS)
  - Governing parties: PS, cdH, Ecolo

Area
  - Total: 27.22 km^{2} (10.51 sq mi)

Population (2018-01-01)
  - Total: 9,353
  - Density: 343.6/km^{2} (889.9/sq mi)
- Postal codes: 4340, 4342
- NIS code: 62006
- Area codes: 04
- Website: www.awans.be

Awans (French pronunciation: [awɑ̃]; Walloon: Awan) is a municipality of Wallonia located in the province of Liège, Belgium.

On January 1, 2006, Awans had a total population of 8,696. The total area is 27.16 km^{2} which gives a population density of 320 inhabitants per km^{2}.

The municipality consists of the following districts: Awans, Fooz, Hognoul, Othée, and Villers-l'Évêque.

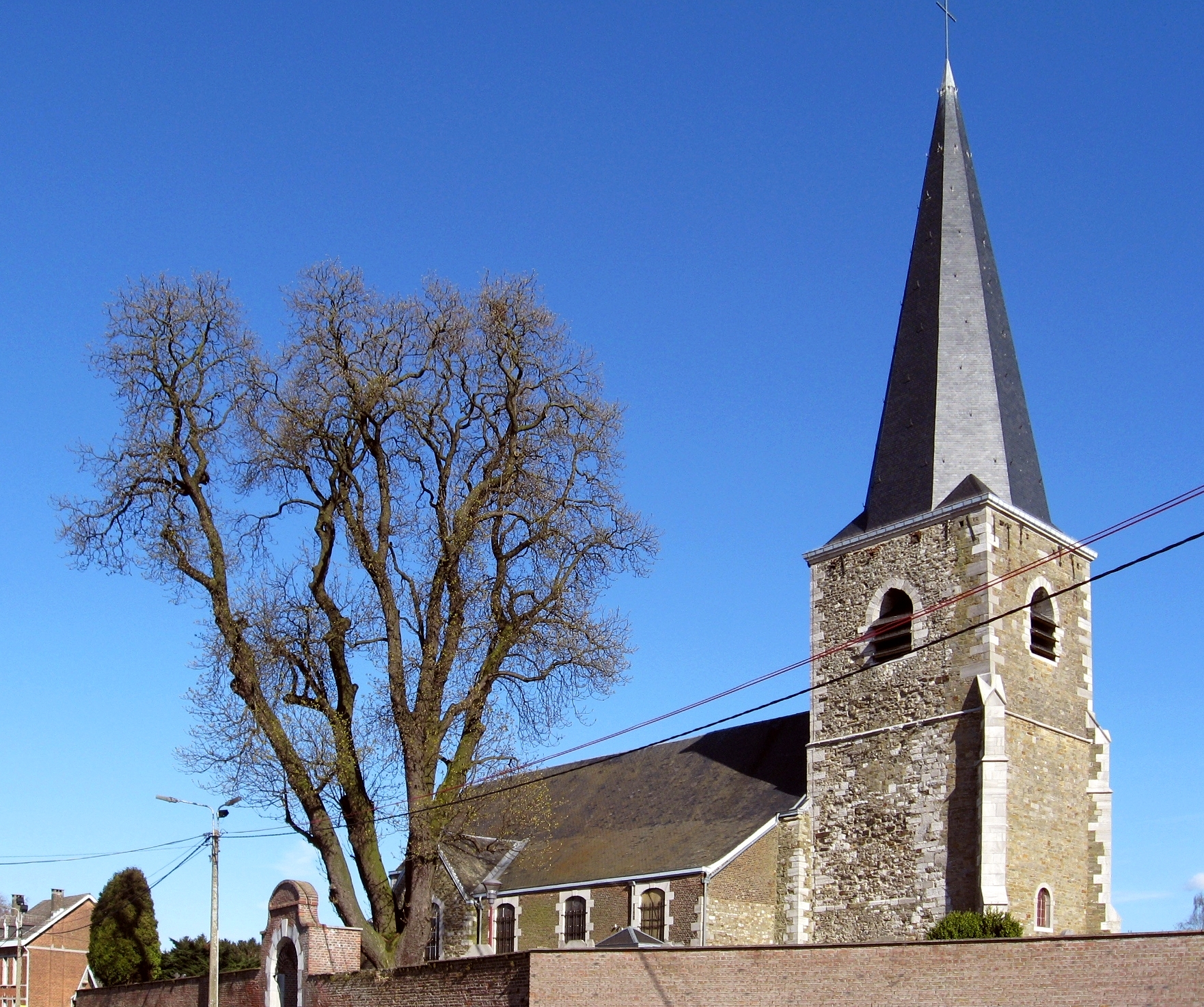
St. Agathe

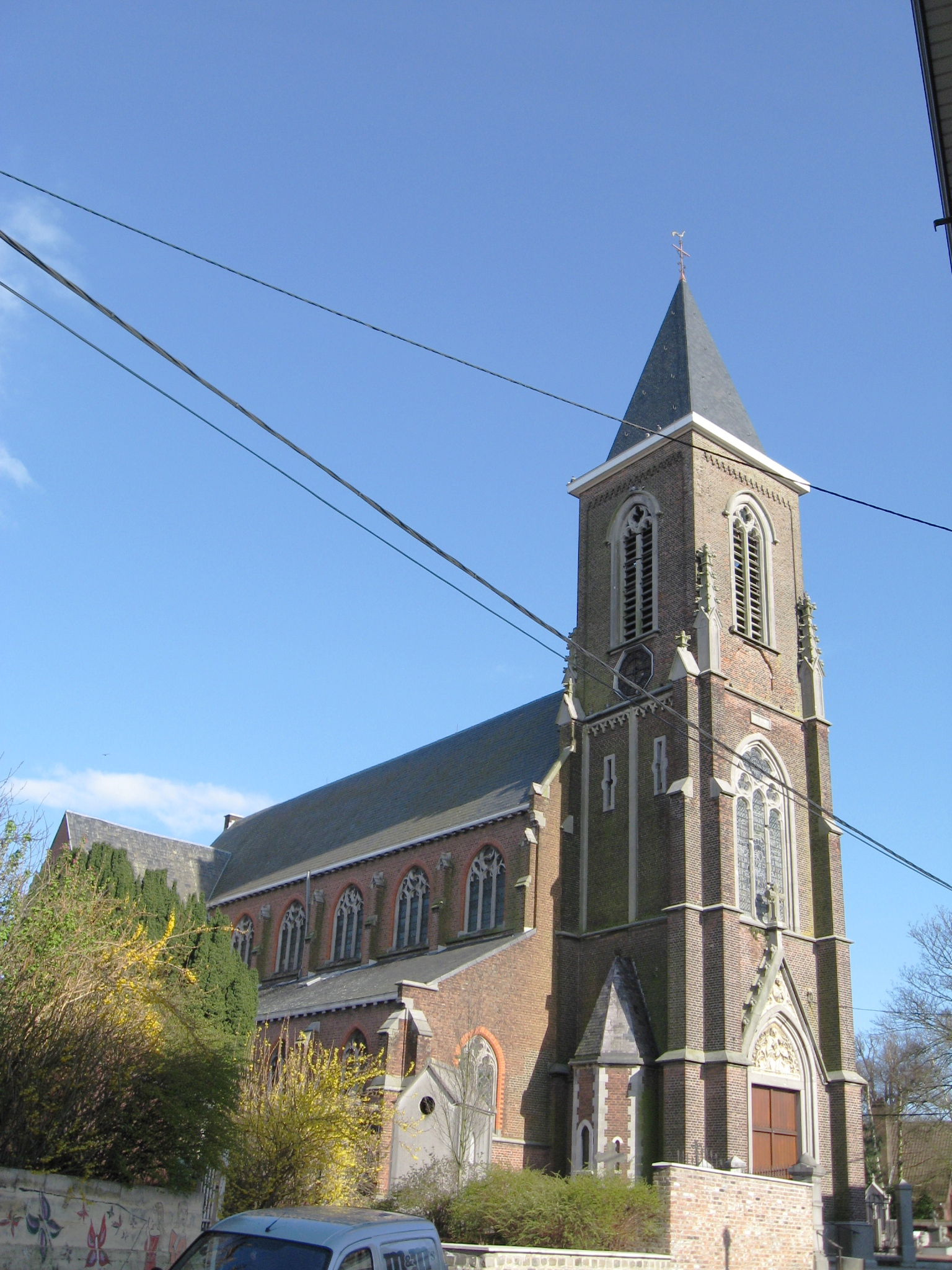
Church Saint-Peter-and-Paul in Othée

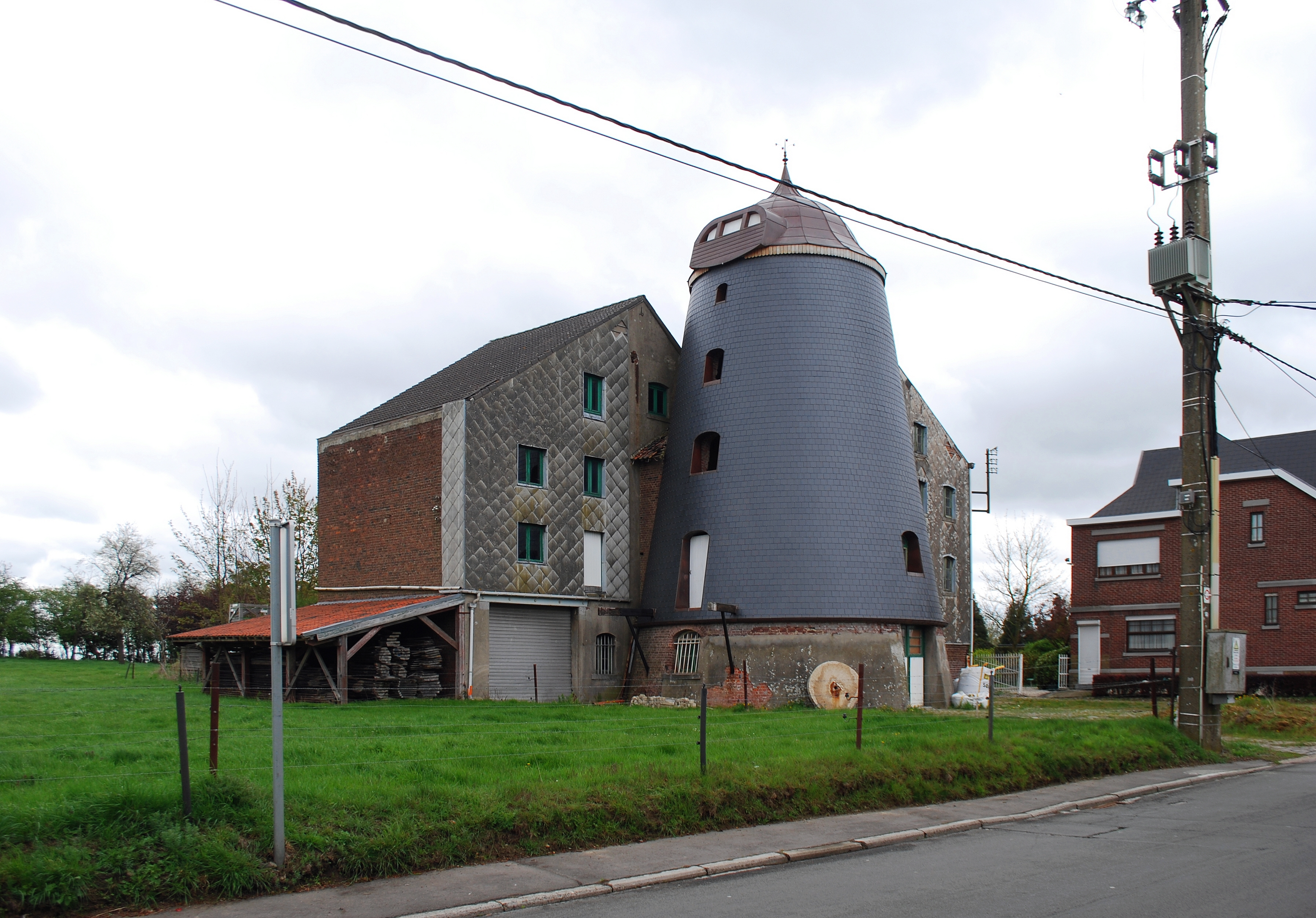
Old mill in Othée

== See also ==
- List of protected heritage sites in Awans
