= Khabibulin =

Khabibulin or Khabibullin (Russian: Хабибуллин or Хабибулин), feminine: Khabibulina or Khabibullina is a Tatar masculine patronymic surname derived from the given name Habibullah with the Russian patronymic suffix -in; also Habibullin / Habibullina. It may refer to:

- Albina Khabibulina (born 1992), Uzbekistani tennis player
- Anton Khabibulin, Russian musician
- Farid Khabibulin, Uzbek professional footballer
- Muzakhid Khabibulin, Soviet speed skater
- Nikolai Khabibulin (born 1973), Russian ice hockey goaltender
- Timur Khabibulin (born 1995), Kazakhstani tennis player

== See also ==
- Habibullaev
