= Naseer Ahmed Khan =

Naseer Ahmad Khan Tareen
- Born: 20 March 1936; Balochistan, British India
- Died: 24 June 2020; Balochistan, Pakistan
- Known for: The Markhor hero of Balochistan

Sardar Naseer Ahmad Khan Tareen The Markhor hero of Balochistan ( 1936-2020) was a well-known Pashtun tribal chieftain, and a social activist and public philanthropist from Baluchistan, Pakistan.

== Background ==
Naseer Khan was the head, or chief, of a section or clan of the Tareen (or Tarin) Pashtun tribe.

== Public service projects ==
Among the various well-known projects for public benefit founded and run by Tareen, are the BRSP (Balochistan Rural Support Programme) and the TWCP Torghar Wildlife Conservation Project for wild life of Markhor. In 2013 the BRSP was given a special award for dedicated public service in Baluchistan area, or province, of Pakistan. The Torghar Project which was launched by Tareen in early 1980s, is deemed to be one of the most significant efforts at sustainable community-based environmental management in Pakistan.
