= Habibi (surname) =

Habibi is an Arabic surname. The word is the masculine form of Habib meaning beloved. Notable people with the surname include:

- Abdul Hai Habibi (1910–1984), Afghan historian and politician
- Abdullah Habibi (fl. 1972–2017), Afghan army general and diplomat
- Alfian Habibi (born 1985), Indonesian footballer
- Emam-Ali Habibi (1931–2025), Iranian freestyle wrestler
- Emile Habibi (1922–1996), Palestinian and Israeli Arab writer and politician
- Goudarz Habibi (born 1947), Iranian footballer
- Hamed Habibi (born 1978), Iranian poet and writer
- Hassan Habibi (1937–2013), Iranian politician, lawyer and scholar
- Hassan Habibi (footballer) (born 1939), Iranian football player and manager
- Majid Habibi (born 1981), Iranian voice actor and dub director
- Mohammad-Nabi Habibi (1946–2019), Iranian politician and sociologist
- Nader Habibi, Iranian-American economist
- Natavan Habibi (born 1981), Azerbaijani singer and actress
- Paul Habibi (born before 2004), American real estate entrepreneur and academic
- Parastoo Habibi (born 2002), Iranian para-athlete
- Shafiqa Habibi (born 1947), Afghan journalist, activist and politician
- Shahla Habibi (1958–2017), Iranian politician
