= Flag of Tajikistan =

Republic of Tajikistan
- Use: National flag
- Proportion: 1:2
- Adopted: 24 November 1992; 33 years ago
- Design: An unequal horizontal tricolor of red, white and green in a 2:3:2 ratio, with a yellow crown surmounted by an arc of seven stars at the centre.
- Designed by: Zuhur Habibullaev
- Use: National flag
- Proportion: 1:2
- Design: A variant of the national flag with color shades derived from the former flag of Iran (1933–1979).
- Use: Presidential standard
- Proportion: 1:2
- Design: A variant of the national flag charged with a gold Derafsh Kāviān extending beyond the central stripe with one seven-pointed star per corner and a winged lion at its center.
- Use: Civil flag and ensign
- Proportion: 1:2
- Design: A unequal blank horizontal tricolor of red, white and green in a 2:3:2 ratio to distinguish it from the flag of Hungary.

The national flag of Tajikistan was adopted in November 1992, replacing the flag of the Tajik Soviet Socialist Republic of 1953. The flag of Tajikistan is an unequal horizontal tricolour of red, white, and green, defaced with a yellow crown surmounted by an arc of seven stars at the centre. It has a width ratio of 2:3:2. The tricolour preserves the choice of colours from the former Tajik Soviet flag, as well as the 1:2 proportions.

Flag Day is celebrated on 24 November, the date on which it was officially adopted.

== Design and symbolism ==
The flag of Tajikistan is a tricolour of red, white, and green. The red represents the unity of the nation, as well as victory and sunrise. The red also serves as a symbol of the former Russian and Soviet eras, the workers, and the warriors who sacrificed their lives to protect the land. The white represents purity, morality, the snow and ice of the mountains, and cotton. The green represents the bountiful generosity of nature, fertile valleys, the religion of Islam, and the celebration of Novruz. Other interpretations of the colours state that the flag symbolically unifies the people of Tajik society: the red stripe represents the manual labour class, the white stripe represents the intellectual worker class, and the green represents the agricultural class living in Tajikistan's rural or mountainous regions.

The red and green stripes on the top and bottom are equal in size, while the central white stripe is one and a half times wider.

The crown and stars are set in a rectangle that takes up 80% of the white stripe's height. The crown represents the Samanid dynasty and the Tajik people, as the name Tajik is connected in popular etymology with the Persian word tâj ('crown'). The flag of Tajikistan features seven stars because of the significance of the number seven in Persian mythology, where it represents perfection and happiness. According to traditional belief, the heavens feature seven mountains and seven orchard gardens, with a star shining above each mountain.

== Presidential standard ==
The standard of the president of Tajikistan was introduced in 2006 on the occasion of the inauguration ceremony for the third term of Emomali Rahmon as head of state. It uses the Tajik tricolour charged with a depiction of the Derafsh Kāviān, the Sassanid royal standard. Inside the Derafsh Kāviān is a depiction of a winged lion against a blue sky, with a smaller representation of the crown and seven stars above it.

The centre of the standard features elements formerly used as symbols of Tajikistan in the Emblem of Tajikistan. The presidential standard also includes a star in each of the four corners, representing the four regions of Tajikistan.

== Historical flags ==
The flag of Tajik SSR and post-Soviet Tajikistan in use from 1953 to 1992.

1953–1992:This design was the backside of the Tajik SSR flag.

Under Soviet rule, the Union Republic used a flag derived from the flag of the Soviet Union and representing Communism, which was approved in 1953. The flag is similar to the Soviet Union design but with the addition of a white and a green stripe. This flag also contains the red‑white‑green colour order, with the white stripe larger than the green, which is currently used in the national flag.

As a Soviet republic, the red symbolised the workers' revolution, the white symbolised cotton, and the green symbolised agriculture.

The Soviet‑era flag was two‑sided. Its reverse was a mirror of the obverse, without the hammer, sickle, and star. This design remained in use until the new Tajik flag was adopted, making Tajikistan the last former Soviet country to receive a new flag.

== Gallery ==
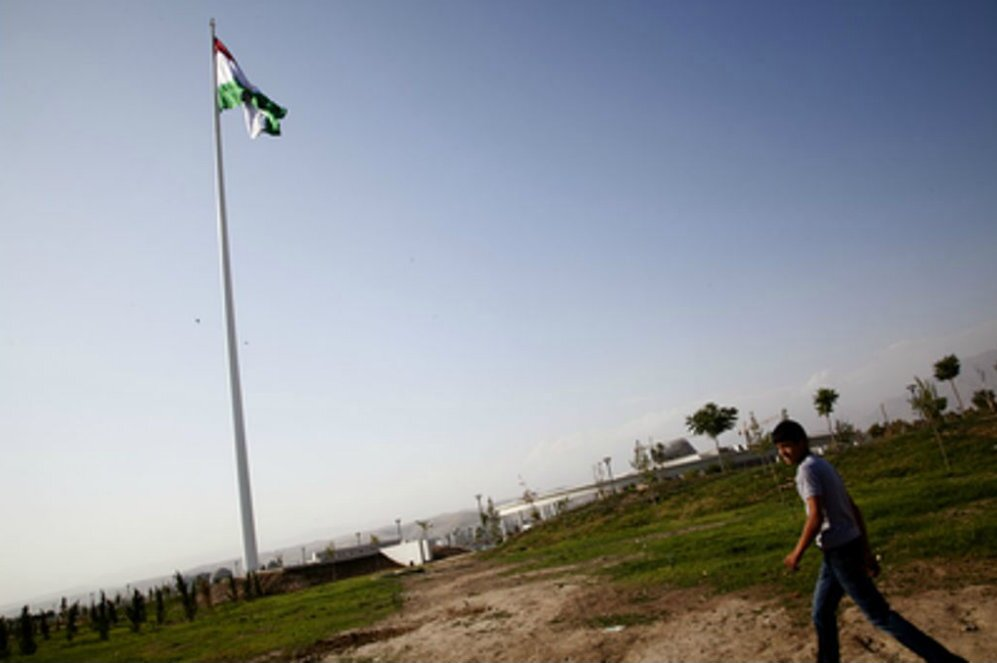
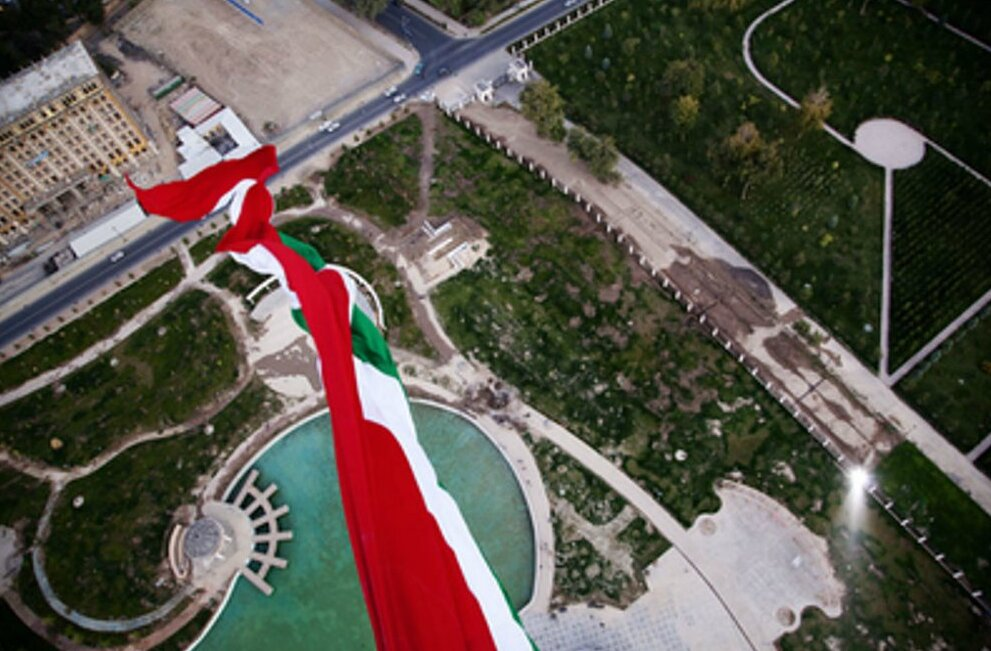
In celebration of Tajikistan's 20th anniversary of independence, construction of the Dushanbe Flagpole — which would become the world's tallest flagpole — started on the national flag day in 2010. At 165 metres tall, it held the world record from its completion in 2011 until 2014 when it was surpassed by the Jeddah Flagpole.

== See also ==
- Emblem of Tajikistan
- National symbols of Tajikistan
- History of Tajikistan
- Flag of Iran (reverse arrangement)
- Flag of Hungary (similar simple tricolour, 1:1:1 ratio)
