= Habibti =

Habibti may refer to:

- Habibti (album), 2026 Drake album
- Habibti (horse) (foaled 1980), Irish-bred, British-trained racehorse

== See also ==
- Habibi (disambiguation)
