= Habibie (surname) =

Habibie is a Gorontalo (Indonesia) surname. Notable people with the surname include:

- B. J. Habibie (1936–2019), president of Indonesia 1998–1999
- Hasri Ainun Habibie (1937–2010), Indonesian physician and wife of President B. J. Habibie
- Junus Effendi Habibie (1937–2012), Indonesian diplomat and brother of President B. J. Habibie
- Rusli Habibie (born 1963), Indonesian politician, nephew of President B. J. Habibie, and current governor of Gorontalo

== See also ==
- Habibi (disambiguation)
- Habibie & Ainun, a 2012 Indonesian drama film
  - Rudy Habibie, a 2016 prequel
