= Cairo Flagpole =

Tallest flagpole since 2021

New Capital Flagpole
- سارية العاصمة الجديدة
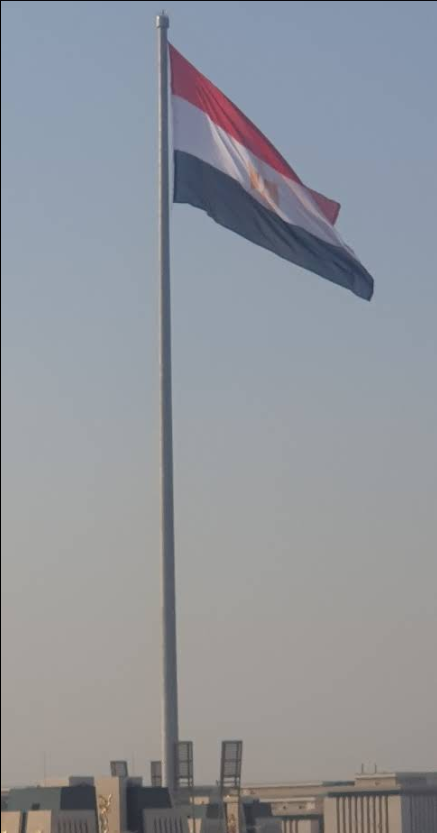
- Interactive map of the New Capital Flagpole area

Record height
- Tallest in the world since 2021^{[I]}
- Preceded by: Jeddah Flagpole

General information
- Location: New Capital, Egypt
- Coordinates: 30.0135270°N 31.7548677°E

Height
- Height: 201.952 m (663 ft)

New Capital Flagpole is the world's tallest flagpole, at 201.952 m (662 ft 7 in) tall. Located in the New Capital of Egypt, it was erected on the 26 December 2021. The flagpole was constructed by the Gharably Integrated Engineering Company in Egypt. It weighs 1,040 tons and flies a 60 x 40 m (197 x 131 ft) flag. The flag was manufactured by Creation Arts for Flags and Digital Printing LLC, based in Abu Dhabi, United Arab Emirates.

Records
Preceded by Jeddah Flagpole	World's tallest flagpole December 2021 –	Succeeded by none
