= Emblem of Tajikistan =

National emblem

- Armiger: Republic of Tajikistan
- Adopted: 28 September 1993
- Shield: Rising sun, a crown surmounted by an arc of seven stars at the center
- Supporters: Cotton and Wheat
- Other elements: a wreath composed, on the right, the ears of grain and, on the left, the stems of cotton, and below, a book

The State Emblem of Tajikistan is a modified version of the original emblem of the Tajik Soviet Socialist Republic that was in use until the dissolution of the Soviet Union in 1991.

== History ==
Prior to the Russian Revolution, the territory of Turkestan, of which Tajikistan was part, used the device of a black unicorn on a golden shield, blazoned or, a unicorn passant sable. However, Tajikistan itself had no symbol.

Until 1992, Tajikistan had an emblem similar to all other Soviet Republics.

The first emblem of independent Tajikistan from 1992–1993 was the Lion and Sun symbol, which was a historic symbol of Persia, to which Tajikistan has cultural ties. It was changed to the current version by the government of Emomali Rahmon, which came to power at the end of 1992. Like other post-Soviet republics whose symbols do not predate the October Revolution, the current emblem retains some components of the Soviet one.

Coat of arms of Tajik ASSR (23 February 1929–April 1929)

Coat of arms of Tajik ASSR (April 1929–24 February 1931)

Coat of arms of the Tajik SSR (1936–1937)

Coat of arms of Tajikistan (1940–1992)

Coat of arms of Tajikistan (1992–1993)

Coat of arms of Tajikistan (1993–2024)

== Description ==
The crown at the center of the emblem is the same as the Tajik national flag, and refers to the Persian word taj, meaning crown, from which the name of the Tajik people is said to be derived, according to one interpretation. The base of the emblem contains a representation of a book and the Pamir Mountains. The emblem is flanked by cotton on one side and wheat on the other, as well a banner of the national red-white-green colors of Tajikistan is wrapped around the cotton and wheat replacing the red color containing the motto of the Soviet Union "Workers of the world, unite!" written in the Russian and Tajik languages.

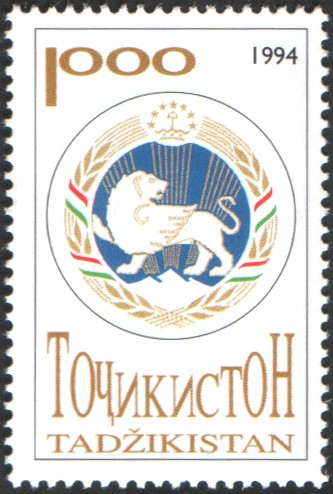
First Emblem of Tajikistan on a 1994 postage stamp

== See also ==
- Emblem of the Tajik Soviet Socialist Republic
- Flag of Tajikistan
