= Tarim =

Tarim may refer to:

- Tarim, Yemen, a city in Yemen
- Tarim District, Yemen
- Tarim River, China
- Tarim Basin, China
  - Tarim mummies, a series of mummies which have been excavated at Niya, an oasis in the Tarim Basin
- Tarim, the monotheistic god worshiped by multiple religions in Dave Sim's Cerebus the Aardvark graphic novel series

== See also ==
- Tarin (disambiguation)
