= List of protected heritage sites in Awans =

This table shows an overview of the beschermd erfgoed in the Walloon town Awans. This list is part of Belgium's protected heritage sites.

Object	Year/architect	Town/section	Address	Coordinates	Number^{?}	Image
Sainte Agathe church ^{(nl)} ^{(fr)}		Awans	rue de l'Eglise, n°19	50.664458°N 5.461147°E	62006-CLT-0001-01 Info	Ensemble van de Sint-Agathakerk ('Sainte Agathe') en diens omgeving
Park ^{(nl)} ^{(fr)}		Awans	rue du Château, n°1	50.668982°N 5.472199°E	62006-CLT-0003-01 Info	
Two chestnut trees ^{(nl)} ^{(fr)}		Awans	rue du Château	50.668090°N 5.477777°E	62006-CLT-0004-01 Info	
Balcony and steps of the pastorage of Villers l'Evèque ^{(nl)} ^{(fr)}		Awans		50.704379°N 5.438814°E	62006-CLT-0006-01 Info	
Notre-Dame Church ^{(nl)} ^{(fr)}		Awans	Villers-l'Evêque	50.704634°N 5.440190°E	62006-CLT-0007-01 Info	Kerk van Onze Lieve Vrouw, voormalige kerk van de Heilige Maagd (koor en noorder transept)
Sainte Agathe Church ^{(nl)} ^{(fr)}		Awans	rue de l'Eglise	50.664514°N 5.461636°E	62006-CLT-0008-01 Info	Kerk ('Sainte-Agathe'), Awans
Tumulus of Othée ^{(nl)} ^{(fr)}		Awans		50.723360°N 5.459600°E	62006-CLT-0009-01 Info	Tumulus van Othée en diens zone van bescherming
Tumulus of Othée archeological site ^{(nl)} ^{(fr)}		Awans		50.723360°N 5.459600°E	62006-PEX-0001-01 Info	Tumulus van Othée, de archeologische site

== See also ==
- List of protected heritage sites in Liège (province)
