= Abdul Majid Khan Tarin =

Abdul Majid Khan Tarin (also spelt Abdul Majeed Khan) (1877–1939), Khan-Sahib, OBE, was a magistrate, MLA and philanthropist of the North West Frontier Province of former British India.

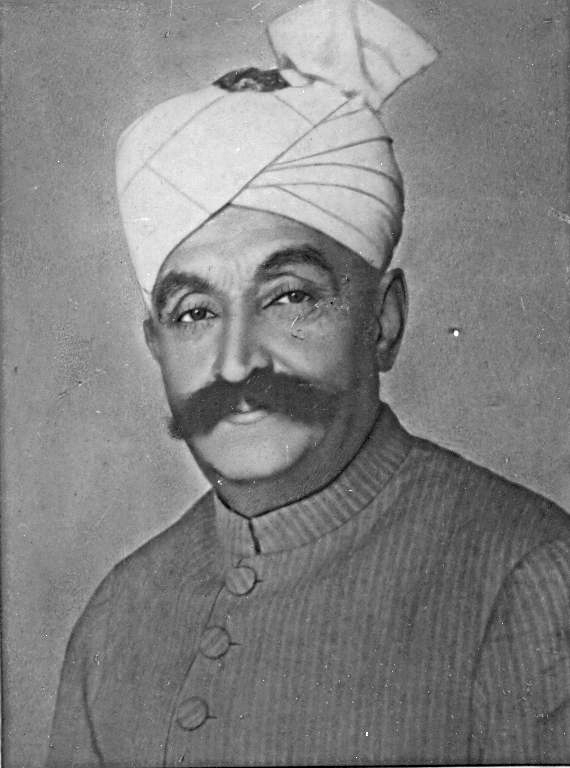
Tarin in the 1930s

== Early life and education ==
Tarin was born to a Pathan landlord and aristocrat from Hazara Division, Muhammad Habib Khan Tarin (or Tareen), (c.1829/30-Dec.1888), Hon. Nawab Bahadur, Risaldar, CSI, who was also an ex-cavalry officer and a landed jagirdar of Talokar and Dheri estates in Haripur, NWFP (present-day, Khyber Pakhtunkhwa). At his father's death Majid Khan was a young boy and the family estates were placed under the Court of Wards. He was initially taught at home by English tutors, then sent to the Aitchison College, Lahore, and then to a mission school in Simla. After his Matriculation from there he proceeded to England in 1899 and qualified as a barrister in 1901. He was called to the Bar at Lincoln's Inn in April 1902.

== Career ==
On returning to India, Tarin became a junior magistrate in the Punjab service, then a 1st class magistrate, extra assistant commissioner and then deputy commissioner; he also served briefly as a judge in the Punjab Sessions Courts. On retiring from service in 1934, he became an early and active member of the NWFP (now Khyber-Pakhtunkhwa in Pakistan) chapter of the All India Muslim League and a close associate of Sir Sahibzada Abdul Qayyum, and was a member of the NWFP Legislative Assembly (1937–1939). Although keen to protect Muslim rights, he remained a firm proponent of a consolidated Muslim entity within a larger Indian confederation until his death at his ancestral village, Talokar, in June 1939.

== Legacy ==
Tarin was also a philanthropist. Apart from his support of the establishment of the Islamia College, Peshawar, and support of various Indian Muslim charities, he played a considerable role in the early development of his native Haripur area in Hazara, NWFP. He founded several charitable schools, set up a public tuberculosis ward at the Haripur Government Hospital, provided for a system of educational scholarships for local students, as well as supporting numerous needy people.

Khan Sahib had three sons and two daughters. His eldest son, Abdus Salim Khan, a Pakistani diplomat, was married to former Pakistani minister, Begum Mahmooda Salim Khan, daughter of the late Punjab Premier, Sardar Sir Sikandar Hayat Khan (1892–1942). His second son Abdul Hamid Khan was an agriculturist of NWFP, whilst his third son, Abdul Rashid Khan, was commissioned in the British Indian Army and later served in the Pakistan Army after the independence of Pakistan in 1947. The Pakistani poet and research scholar, Omer Tarin is a great-grandson of Abdul Majid Khan Tarin.
