= Muhammad Habib Khan Tarin =

Muhammad Habib Khan Tarin (1829-December 1888), Risaldar-Bahadur, CSI, was a cavalry officer of Tarin descent, who lived in the Hazara region on the Punjab Frontier, in British India.

== Background ==
Muhammad Habib Khan was the son of Karam Khan, settled at Talokar (village), near Haripur town, in the Hazara region In 1849, after the conclusion of the Second Anglo-Sikh War of 1849, the Punjab and its Frontier were annexed by the British and Major James Abbott (Indian Army officer) was sent as the Hazara's first Deputy commissioner. The Tarin clan, which had previously resisted Sikh rule, refused to accept the new British rulers and came into conflict with Major Abbott, who deposed many of the tribe's chiefs and leaders and confiscated their lands and properties. Habib Khan was also one of these chieftains and he escaped into the nearby Gandhgarhi hills.

The situation became very hazardous for Habib Khan when Major Abbott tightened control over the Gandhgarhi hills and environs, through the help of the Tahirkheli and Mishwani tribes, and he might have been taken prisoner at this time. However, by chance, Khan came into contact with another British officer Colonel Robert Cornelis Napier (later Field Marshal Lord Napier of Magdala), who was working on a road construction project nearby; and Napier befriended and helped him to obtain an amnesty from the Punjab Government, enabling him to return home.

== Military career ==
Napier realised that he could be an effective native military officer, and he utilised him during the First Black Mountain Campaign of late 1852 and later on, in other campaigns. In Spring 1856, Habib Khan, on Napier's recommendation, went to Lahore, where Captain Thomas Rattray was at that time raising a new battalion for service in Bengal and Bihar., and enrolled as a Jemadar of the cavalry section of what was then the 1st Bengal Military Police Battalion, along with several retainers.

After joining the battalion, Habib Khan served with some distinction in the Sonthal pargannahs, until the outbreak of the Indian Mutiny in 1857, when he was put in charge of a semi-independent squadron of cavalry, which "further developed its role as a highly mobile body, employed ad hoc across Bengal and eventually on the North-East Frontier [of India]...[the] cavalry revealed to be a great advantage and this arm was therefore increased to five hundred sabres".

During the period May 1857 to August 1858, the regimental history informs that "The troop of cavalry seemed to have seen very strenuous service- its record averages practically ten engagements per man- and Jemadar Hubeeb [sic] Khan heads the list with fourteen engagements".

After the end of the Mutiny, Habib Khan was promoted Risaldar commanding the cavalry section for his meritorious services, and journeyed to Bhutan and Assam on behalf of the government. In 1864, the infantry section of the 1st Bengal Military Battalion was taken into the line as a regular infantry battalion of the Bengal Army as the 45th (Rattray's Sikhs) Regiment of Native Infantry, and the cavalry section was disbanded, and Habib Khan thereafter retired and left for home. He was a recipient of the Indian Mutiny Medal.

== Later life ==
On retirement, Habib Khan came back to Hazara area, and also entered into extensive litigation against the Punjab Government, to obtain restitution of a number of his properties, and in settling the affairs of his considerable estates.

In 1872, he was made a JP and a Kursi Nasheen for the Talokar Haripur area, and also given the personal title of Nawab-Bahadur and awarded the CSI. and received a 'Jangi Inam' (war/veteran soldier's allowance). Between 1868 and 1880 he assisted senior officers in the management of Frontier affairs along the Hazara hills, receiving certificates of commendation from Sir Herbert Benjamin Edwardes and NG Waterfield, Commissioner of the Peshawar Division.

Habib Khan actively supported the Muslim liberal reformer Sir Syed Ahmad Khan and his movement to educate Muslim youth according to the contemporary modern standards, what was later to develop into the Aligarh Movement; and along with the likes of Nawab Muhammad Hayat Khan and other Punjabi and Pashtun leaders, he made significant contributions towards this cause. It was claimed that, "unlike many narrow-minded and bigoted Muslim chiefs" he was a person of eclectic views and followed a liberal, tolerant Sufic perspective, maintaining 'close life-long friendships with his old Sikh and Hindu colleagues-in-arms'.

Among his children, two sons, Khan-sahib Abdul Majid Khan Tarin, OBE, and Abdul Latif Khan Tarin, IDSM, were notable.

== See also ==
- British Indian Army
- Bengal Army
