= Habibullah Khan Tarin =

Pakistan Army officer

Major (retd) Habibullah Khan Tareen (born 1947) is a former Pakistan Army officer, a Member of Provincial Assembly and a former Speaker of the Khyber Pakhtunkhwa Assembly.

He belongs to the Tareen (or Tareen) tribe of Haripur District, Hazara, Pakistan and is settled in Darwesh village.

Khan did not take part in various elections, due to corruption charges against him in different schemes and projects. Due to anti corruption on inquiry against him on corruption charges, this led him away from political ground, in order to stop investigation against him and several others involved with him in it, but later while making his return into politics he was disqualified in 2008 general elections over a fake degree, and after this election again he did not take part in several elections, due too degree issue and other political commitments that he could not fulfill with his district and constituency people. He is currently in PML N and his son is expected to contest in his place in coming years from his constituency pk40, but so far has not started his entry into political field, and in 2024 general elections, whilst being in PML N has moved away from political ground completely and has settled differences with his party fellows in his district.
