= Nadeem Tarin =

Indian educationist, philanthropist and businessman

Nadeem Akhter Tarin
- Born: Sarai Tarin, Sambhal, Uttar Pradesh, India
- Citizenship: Indian
- Education: Aligarh Muslim University
- Occupations: Businessman, Educationist, Philanthropist
- Known for: Business Man
- Spouse: Arjumand (wife) Noreen Jan (wife)

Nadeem Akhter Tarin is an educationist, philanthropist and businessman in Saudi Arabia.

== Early life and education ==
Nadeem Tarin was born in Sambhal (Sarai Tarin), Uttar Pradesh, India. He spent his childhood in his hometown and primarily studied in an Urdu medium school. He then completed his secondary education in the English medium and continued on to study at the Aligarh Muslim University (AMU). In 1979 he completed his graduation (B.Sc. Engineering - Civil) from Zakir Husain College of Engineering and Technology of AMU.

In the year 2015, Nadeem Tarin was conferred an honorary doctorate degree on him by Aligarh Muslim University

== Professional career ==
After earning his bachelor's degree in engineering, he worked as a project engineer at the Municipal Corporation of Delhi, New Delhi in the year 1980. Thereafter, he moved to the Kingdom of Saudi Arabia as a site engineer at the "Saudi Al Terais Trading, Industrial & Contracting Company". He has lived there ever since and has progressed to become prominent businessman and educationist in KSA.

=== Professional Positions Held ===
- Co-founder, Partner & Director (Inshaat Salman Al-Terais Contracting Co., KSA)

== Philanthropy and Contributions to Education ==
Nadeem Tarin has given educational activities the prime position in his life. His most noteworthy contribution is a 150-room hostel which accommodates 401 students for the Aligarh Muslim University.

Apart from this, he established the Mission International Academy, Sambhal as well as the Ayesha Tarin Modern Public School in Aligarh in the year 1994. Thereafter, he concentrated more on Saudi Arabia, consequently becoming the chairman of the managing committee of the International Indian School, Riyadh. In 2004, he started the Daratassalam International Delhi Public School in Riyadh, under the aegis of the Delhi Public School Society, New Delhi. He further enhanced his contribution by establishing the Dunes International School, Al Khobar in the Eastern Region of Saudi Arabia in early 2011.

In terms of higher education, he, along with the efforts of others has been successful in initiating and implementing a plan to establish 5 centres of the Aligarh Muslim University around India with the cooperation of the Indian Government. Moreover, he has significantly contributed towards the establishment of the Maulana Mohammad Ali Jauhar University, Rampur as well as a Technical Institute (ITI) in Sambhal, UP.

As a member of many trusts and NGOs, Nadeem strives to carry forward and implement the ideas of the founder of the Aligarh Muslim University, Sir Syed Ahmed Khan, who envisioned for people from all walks of life to be properly and morally educated. As such, he initiated the Nadeem Tarin Scholarship wherein a few bright students are selected from India and are given the opportunity to go to the US for Higher Education.

In October 2015, Nadeem Tarin and the Vice Chancellor of Aligarh Muslim University, Lt. Gen. Zameer Uddin Shah, jointly laid the foundation stone of a new hall of residence for one thousand boys, Riyadh Hall, in Aligarh. The project is funded by the members of the AMU Alumni Association, Riyadh, KSA.

== Social Activities ==
- Founding president and Member – Aligarh Muslim University Old Boys’ Association (AMU Alumni Association), Riyadh
- Member – University Court, Aligarh Muslim University, Aligarh, UP, India
- Member – Duty Society, Aligarh, UP, India
- Member – All India Educational Movement, New Delhi, India
- Member – India Forum, Riyadh, KSA
- Member – India Business Forum, Riyadh, KSA
- Member – Indian Engineers’ Forum, Riyadh, KSA
