= Zuhur Habibullaev =

Tajikistani artist (1932–2013)

- Зуҳур Ҳабибуллоев ظهور حبیب‌الله‌اف
- Born: January 4, 1932; Stalinabad, Tajik SSR, Soviet Union
- Died: April 8, 2013 (aged 81); Dushanbe, Tajikistan
- Awards: People's Artist of the Tajik SSR (1987)

Zuhur Habibullaev (Tajik: Зуҳур Ҳабибуллаев, Persian: ظهور حبیب‌الله‌اف) (1932 – April 8, 2013) was a Tajikistani artist. Born in Dushanbe, he graduated from Olimov State art College in Dushanbe in 1953 and Mukhin High industrial-art school in St. Petersburg in 1959. His prime work is the design of Flag of Tajikistan. He was a People's Artist of the Republic of Tajikistan and Member of the Union of artists of Tajikistan and has given international exhibitions from 1960. His works are located in museums and private collections in Tajikistan, Russia, Europe and Asia.
