= Paul Habibi =

American businessman and academic

Paul Habibi is an American real estate entrepreneur and UCLA professor. Habibi is principal and co-founder of Habibi Properties, LLC, one of the largest private multi-family housing owners in the Los Angeles metropolitan area. Habibi Properties acquires, develops and manages multi-family and mixed-use real estate projects throughout Southern California. The company also invests in single-family homes, in the Kansas City metropolitan area, and almond and pistachio orchards in California's San Joaquin Valley.

As a tenured lecturer at UCLA Anderson School of Management and UCLA School of Law, Habibi teaches courses in finance, accounting, and real estate, and also serves as faculty advisor for all real estate case competitions. He has taught at UCLA since 2004.

Habibi is also principal and founder of Grayslake Advisors, LLC, a litigation services firm that provides expert testimony and analysis in economics, finance, accounting and real estate. Its clients include major law firms and federal agencies such as the U.S. Attorney's Office, U.S. Securities and Exchange Commission and Federal Bureau of Investigation.

Habibi previously worked as an Investment Banking Associate at Bank of America Merrill Lynch, and prior to that worked as Manager of Transaction Support with The Walt Disney Company. Habibi began his career as an Audit Manager with Arthur Andersen.

== Media ==
Habibi is widely quoted as a real estate expert for various publications, such as The Wall Street Journal, The New York Times, Los Angeles Times, Washington Post, Chicago Tribune, Financial Times, The Boston Globe, San Francisco Chronicle, The San Diego Union-Tribune, The Press-Enterprise, Los Angeles Daily News, Los Angeles Business Journal, San Diego Business Journal, California Real Estate Journal, Daily Breeze, Los Angeles Magazine, The Big Picture, Curbed LA, Santa Monica Daily Press, and LA Weekly.

Habibi has been featured on various television news programs such as CNN, BBC World News, Bloomberg TV, Fox News Channel, NBC News, ABC News, CBS News, KTLA Prime News and KCOP 13 News. He is a frequent guest on NPR radio.

== Education ==
Habibi holds a BA in Accounting from U.C. Santa Barbara and an MBA with Highest Distinction (under Merit Scholarship) from the Ross School of Business at the University of Michigan. He is a licensed Certified Public Accountant (CPA) and Real Estate Broker.
