= Abdus Salim Khan =

Abdus Salim Khan عبد السلیم خان
- Born: Abdus Salim Khan; 28 December 1907; Talokar, Haripur, Hazara, NWFP, British India
- Died: 13 July 1957 (aged 49); London, Britain
- Other name: Khan Sahib
- Occupations: Civil servant; diplomat
- Years active: 1933–1957
- Spouse: Begum Mahmooda Salim Khan (m. 1934)

Abdus Salim Khan, also known as Khan Sahib (28 December 1907 – 12/13 July 1957) was an Indian Civil Servant who later joined Pakistani Civil Service to become a diplomat. He served as an ambassador to several countries representing Pakistan.

== Background ==
Abdus Salim Khan was born on 18 December 1907, at Talokar (village), near Haripur, NWFP, British India, as the eldest son to Abdul Majid Khan Tarin, Khan-sahib, OBE. After completion of his early education at Aitchison College, Lahore, he went on to take higher degrees from the Government College Lahore. In 1934, he was married to Begum Mahmooda Salim Khan, the eldest daughter of then Punjab governor Sir Sikandar Hayat Khan.

== Career ==
Having joined the British Indian Civil Service in 1933, Khan served as a magistrate and a Political Officer in the North-West Frontier Province. During the Second World War he served as a director of the War Supply Department of the then Government of India.

After the establishment of Pakistan in 1947, he was inducted into the country's fledgling Foreign Service of Pakistan and sent first as the country's first Trade Commissioner to Ceylon (now Sri Lanka) and was thereafter appointed as Pakistan's formal representative (High Commissioner) there, a few months later. He was one of the members of Pakistani delegation at Commonwealth of Nations Conference at Colombo, 1950, which framed the Colombo Plan.

Between 1951 and 1953 he held diplomatic postings in Afghanistan and the United States; and in 1953, he was appointed as Pakistan's Chargé d'Affaires in Japan. and then ambassador, playing an instrumental role in firmly establishing positive Japan-Pakistan relations. In 1955, he was posted away as Pakistan Consul-General at San Francisco, USA. In May 1957, he was then posted as Pakistan's Deputy High Commissioner in London, Britain. He died there suddenly of heart failure between 12/13 July 1957 and his body was flown back and buried in his native village.

== See also ==
- Foreign relations of Pakistan
- Ministry of Foreign Affairs (Pakistan)
- Pakistan-United States relations
- Pakistan-Sri Lanka relations
- Bernard Gufler
