= El Habibi Mosque =

Mosque in Tunis, Tunisia

- مسجد الحبيبي
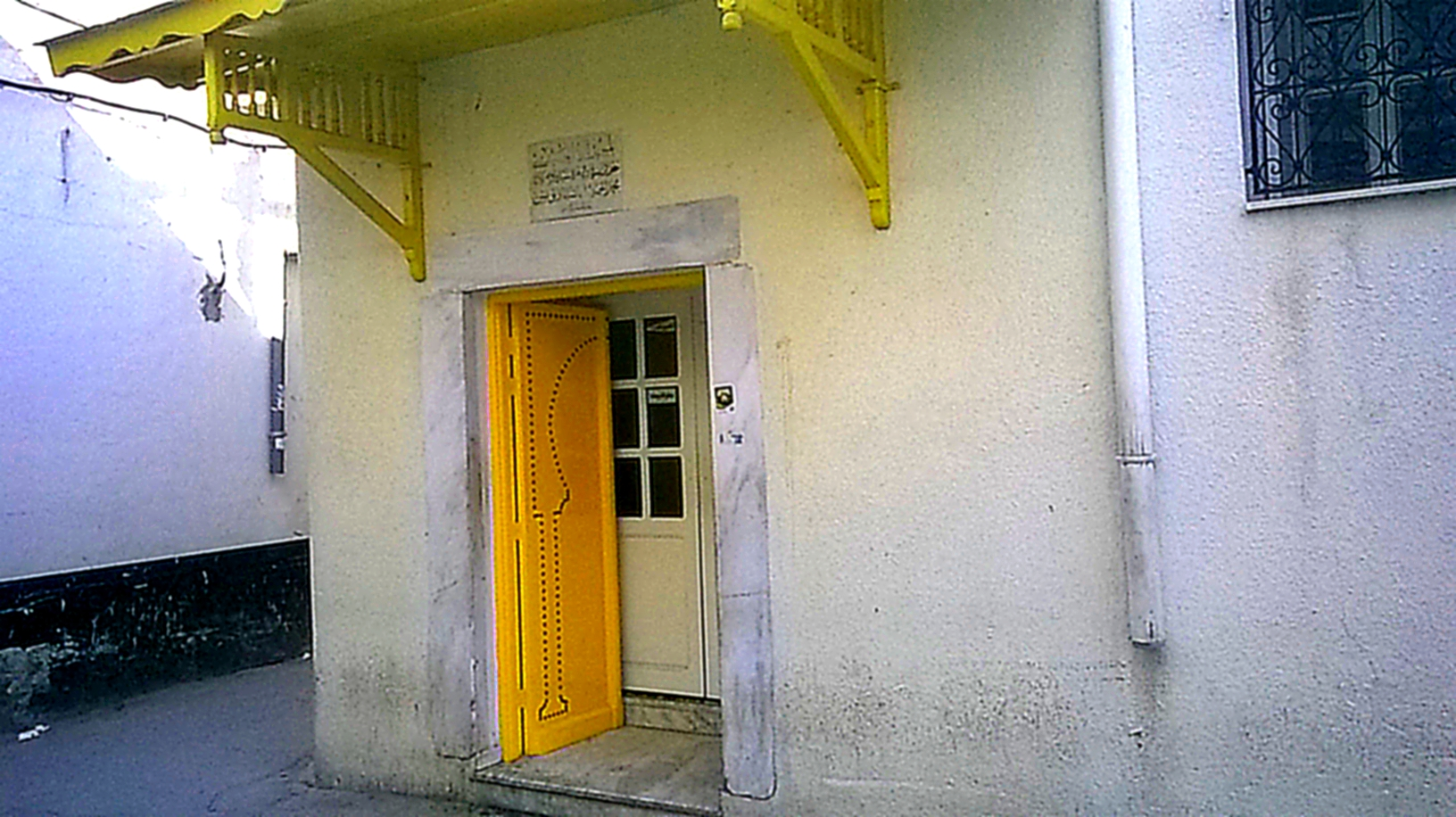

- Location within Tunisia

Religion
- Affiliation: Sunni Islam

Location
- Location: Tunis, Tunisia
- Interactive map of El Habibi Mosque
- Coordinates: 36.798780°N 10.173160°E

Architecture
- Type: Mosque
- Established: 1926

La El Habibi Mosque (Arabic: مسجد الحبيبي), also known as Bou Dhebena Mosque (Arabic: مسجد بو ذبانة) is a small mosque in the Medina of Tunis.

== Localization ==
The mosque can be found in 14 Sidi Saber Street.

== Etymology ==
It got its name from Muhammad VI al-Habib, one of the beys of Tunis who ruled the Husainid dynasty from 1922 until his death.

== History ==
According to the commemorative plaque, El Habibi Mosque was built in 1926.
