= Dushanbe Flagpole =

Flagpole in Tajikistan; tallest in the world from 2011 to 2014

Coordinates: 38.5790°N 68.7801°E

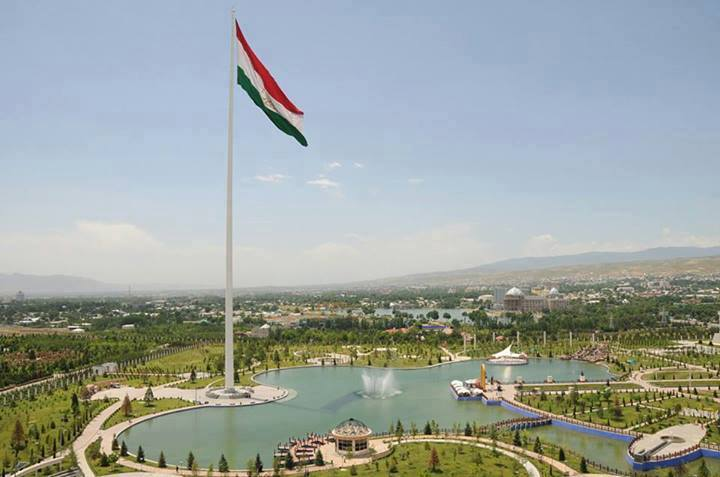

Record height
- Tallest in the world from 2011 to 2014^{[I]}
- Preceded by: National Flagpole
- Surpassed by: Jeddah Flagpole

General information
- Location: Dushanbe, Tajikistan
- Owner: Emomali Rahmon

Height
- Height: 165 m (541 ft)

The Dushanbe Flagpole (Tajik: Боғи парчами Тоҷикистон, romanized: Boghi parchami Tojikiston) is a free–standing flagpole located in front of the Palace of the Nation in Dushanbe, Tajikistan. At 165 metres (541 feet), it was the tallest flagpole in the world from its completion in 2011 until the 2014 erection of the 171 m (561 ft) Jeddah Flagpole. It is now the fifth tallest flagpole in the world. It flies a 30 m × 60 m (98 ft × 197 ft) flag of Tajikistan weighing 700 kilograms (1,540 pounds).

== Construction ==
The flagpole consists of 12-metre sections of steel tube fitted together by crane.

The design phase for the flagpole began in July 2009. Fabrication of the pole's sections was completed in Dubai in October 2010. The sections were then shipped to Dushanbe, where construction of the flagpole began on November 24, 2010, Tajikistan's National Flag Day. The final assembly and erection took place during April and May 2011, with the first test flight of the flag of Tajikistan taking place on May 24, 2011.

The flagpole cost $3.5 million and was part of $210 million worth of projects celebrating the 20th anniversary of Tajik independence.

Records
Preceded by First Baku Flagpole	World's tallest flagpole May 2011 - September 2014	Succeeded by Jeddah Flagpole
