= Tareen =

Pashtun tribe

The Tareen (or Tarin) (Pashto: ترین) is the largest Pashtun tribe inhabiting southern Afghanistan and western Pakistan.

== History ==
Much of the tribe continues to live in their native lands in the southern parts of Afghanistan and Pishin in Baluchistan, Pakistan. During the reign of the Mughal emperor Shah Jahan (1628 to 1658), a group of Tareens emigrated to the area which is now the Hazara region of Khyber Pakhtunkhwa province of Pakistan. The Tareen chiefs resisted the Sikh occupation of Hazara region which resulted in their properties/ land being usurped by Sikh armies.

== Branches (Clans) ==
According to Ni'mat Allah al-Harawi in History of the Afghans, Tareen had three sons namely: Tor, Spin (Aspin or Speen) and Awdal/Born Tareen/Abdali. Their descendants today have adopted the names above as tribal identities and are known as Tor Tareen, Spin Tareen and Bor Tareen. These three major clans are further divided into smaller units.

== Languages ==
The principal languages of Tareen are Tareeno and Pashto and Urdu Punjabi in Pakistan.

== Location ==
Tareens primarily live in Pishin, Dukki, Loralai, Quetta, Ziarat, Mastung, and Harnai districts of Balochistan, while smaller populations are spread all over the province. They can also be found in parts of Afghanistan, punjab and sindh provinces of Pakistan, as well as in India.

In Khyber Pukhtunkhwa, the tribe has 'Tareen Vand' in Mardan. In Haripur, a number of Tareen families claim to have settled there since 1600s, after migrating mainly from Pishin and Kandahar.

== Notable people of Tareen descent ==
- Ahmad Khan Abdali Tareen (1747–1772 AD) 1st Emir of the Durrani Empire.
- Hasan Khan Tarini A prominent Tareeni zamindar of Pūshang (Pishin) in the late 16th century, associated with the Safavid administration of Kandahar.
- Sher Khan Tarini Son of Hasan Khan Tarini and a prominent Tareen chief who became associated with the government of Pishin in the early 17th century.
- Dawlat Khan Tarini A member of the Tareen ruling family associated with Pishin and the successor generation of Sher Khan Tarini.
- Hussain Khan Tareen A Tareen figure traditionally associated with Pishin, although his specific 16th-century historical role requires further documentary verification.
- Muhammad Hassan Musa Khan (30 May 1863 – 1939) the early so-called "Afghan" cameleers in Australia.
- Abdul Majid Khan Tarin OBE, (1877–1939) Magistrate during British times and MP latter.
- Abdul Latif Khan Tarin (1884–1916), IDSM, British-Indian Army officer, WWI.
- Muhammad Habib Khan Tarin CSI, Risaldar, cavalry officer .
- Taj Mohammad Sr. – Former professional footballer.
- Field Marshal Ayub Khan (President of Pakistan) (1907–1974).
- Abdus Salim Khan (1907–1957) former Indian and later Pakistani civil servant and diplomat.
- Sardar Bahadur Khan (1908–1975) Pakistani politician (Chief Minister of Khyber-Pakhtunkhwa).
- Naseer Ahmed Khan Tareen (b. 1936) Pashtun tribal chieftain, social activist and philanthropist.
- Gohar Ayub Khan (b. 1937) Pakistani ex-Army officer, politician and businessman.
- Mubarak Ali (b. 1941) a Pakistani historian, activist and scholar.
- Habibullah Khan Tarin (b. 1947) Pakistani army officer and politician.
- Jalees Ahmed Khan Tareen (b. 1947) Vice-chancellor of B. S. Abdur Rahman University, former vice-chancellor of Pondicherry University.
- Jehangir Khan Tareen (b. 1953) Pakistani politician and businessman.
- Shaukat Tarin (b. 1953) Pakistani banker and politician.
- Haris Tarin (b. 1978) Afghan-American, director of the Muslim Public Affairs Council, USA.
- Nadeem Tarin Indian businessman, philanthropist and educationist settled in Saudi Arabia.
- Muhammad Israr Tareen politician and member of the Pakistani National Assembly.
- Yousuf Ayub Khan former politician and a businessman from Haripur district, Khyber-Pakhtunkhwa, Pakistan.
- Omar Ayub Khan politician and minister from Haripur district, Khyber-Pakhtunkhwa, Pakistan.
- Arshad Ayub Khan (b. 1967) Member of Parliament from Haripur district, Khyber-Pakhtunkhwa, Pakistan.
- Akbar Ayub Khan (b. 1971) Member of Parliament from Haripur district, Khyber-Pakhtunkhwa, Pakistan.
