= Jeddah Flagpole =

Flagpole in western Saudi Arabia

- سارية العلم بجدة
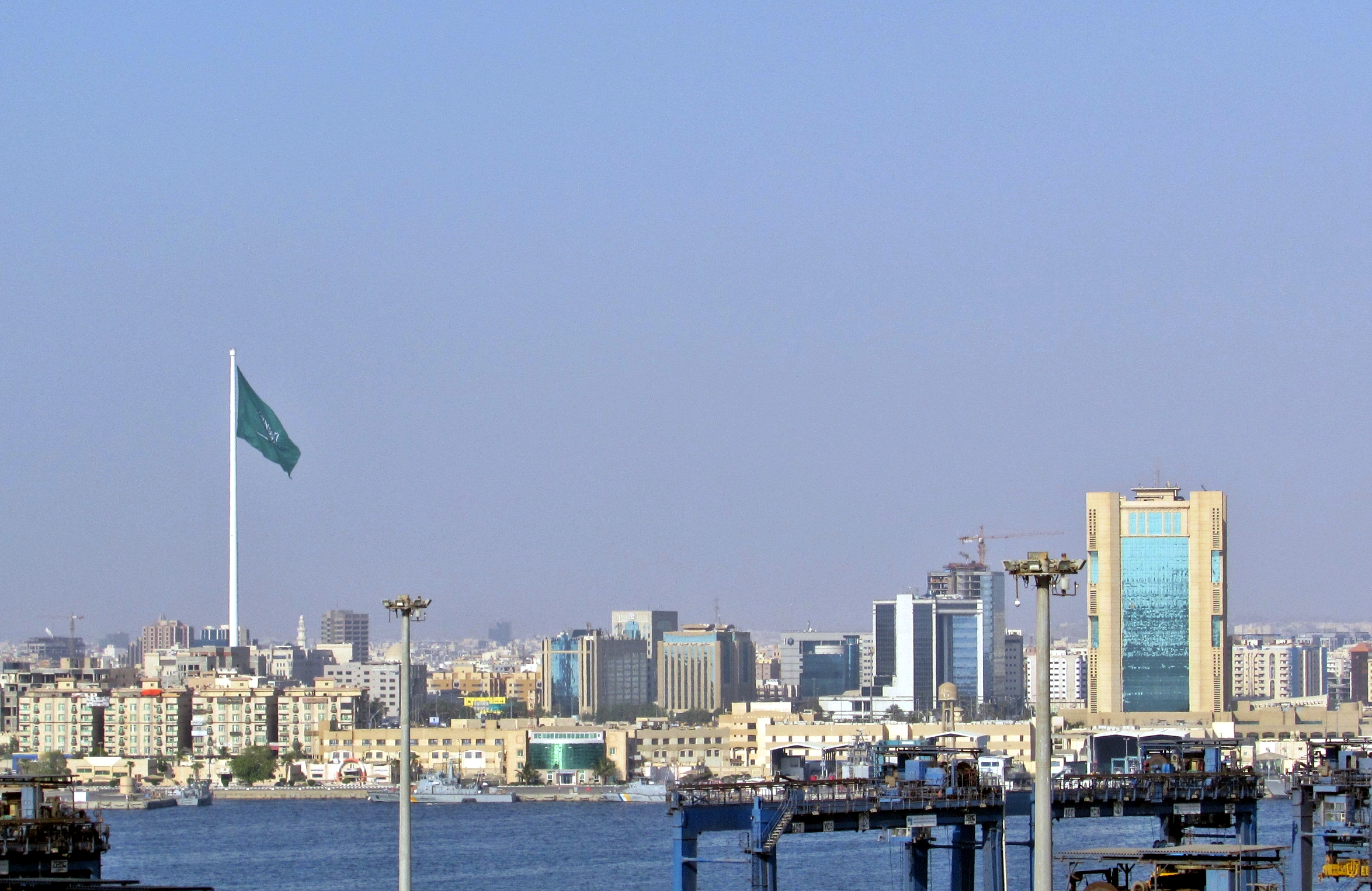
- Interactive map of the Jeddah Flagpole area

Record height
- Tallest in the world from 2014 to 2021^{[I]}
- Preceded by: Dushanbe Flagpole
- Surpassed by: Cairo Flagpole

General information
- Location: Jeddah, Saudi Arabia
- Coordinates: 21.507843°N 39.169732°E

Height
- Height: 171 m (561 ft)

The Jeddah Flagpole is a freestanding flagpole in Jeddah, Saudi Arabia. Standing 171 metres (561 ft) high, it was the tallest flagpole in the world from 2014 until 2021, when the Cairo Flagpole in Cairo, Egypt was erected at a height of 201.952 m (662.57 ft).

The cylindrical flagpole was built of 500 tons of steel in September 2014 by the Abdul Latif Jameel Community Initiative and Al-Babtain Power & Telecom. The flagpole sections were lifted into place by a Liebherr LR 1750 crawler crane with a 182-meter boom operated by Gulf Haulage and Heavy Lift Company.

The flagpole broke the previous height record held by the Dushanbe Flagpole in Tajikistan, which is 165 metres (541 ft) tall. Record holders previous to the Dushanbe flagpole included the 162-metre (531 ft) National Flagpole in Azerbaijan and the 160-metre (520 ft) Panmunjeom Flagpole of Kijŏng-dong in North Korea.

A Saudi Arabian flag, manufactured by Creation Arts for Flags and Digital Printing LLC, based in Abu Dhabi, United Arab Emirates, 49.5 metres (162 ft) by 33 metres (108 ft) and weighing 570 kilograms (1,260 lb), was raised for the first time on 23 September 2014, the National Day of Saudi Arabia.

The Jeddah Flagpole is located in the center of King Abdullah Square, surrounded by 13 lights that represent the 13 governorates of Saudi Arabia. The 26,000-square-meter park, also known as "Custodian of Two Holy Mosques Square", is located next to Jeddah's North Corniche. One-third covered with plants, it represents the two swords and palm tree, the emblem of Saudi Arabia.

Records
Preceded by Dushanbe Flagpole	World's tallest flagpole September 2014 – December 2021	Succeeded by Cairo Flagpole
