= Newtown, Connecticut Flagpole =

Landmark in Newtown, CT

The Newtown, Connecticut Flagpole stands in the middle of the intersection of Main Street, West Street, and Church Hill Road. The pole itself is 100 ft tall and made of steel, with a seasonally rotating American flag. The summer flag is 20 ft x 30 ft, costing an average $700, and the winter flag is 18 ft x 24 ft, costing an average of $375. The landmark is popular with and loved by the locals of Newtown, landing itself a place on the National Register of Historic Places, status as a state-sanctioned landmark, and a sandwich named in its honor at the Newtown General Store.

== History ==
From 1709 to 1792, the Congregational Meeting House stood in the current location of the flagpole. The Meeting House was lifted by men onto logs and rolled by men and horses 132 ft to its current location in the middle of West Street. During the 19th century, patriotism and passion for the American flag were quickly growing. In Newtown, the first pole was erected in 1876 at the centennial celebration, and was, by tradition, cut by Lawrence Mitchell, who brought the 70 ft original pole to Main Street by oxen.

The pole was replaced twice more by wooden poles in 1882 and 1914, due to damages by a lightning strike and then high winds. In 1913, the highway Commissioner tried to have it moved, citing it as a traffic hazard. Popular sentiment won out, though, and the replacement pole in 1914 was 100 ft tall and erected at the 4th of July town celebration.

In 1950, the pole was replaced with a steel pole, due to continuous issues with the wood rotting. This project cost $2,900 (equivalent to $37,901 in 2024), and is the current pole used today.

== Accidents ==
The flagpole has been considered a traffic hazard since the standard of automobile travel arose. Between 2017 and 2021, there were 86 crashes, with 10 of those involving actually driving into the pole. This averages out to 1.6 crashes per month in an area seeing about 45,000 vehicles per month.

In 2021, following a two year long fundraising effort, a $6,000 project to improve the lighting around the flagpole and refinish the pole with a glossy metal adhesive paint was completed

== Keeper of the Flag ==
The first “Keeper of the Flag” was retired police lieutenant David Lyndem, who appointed himself to the position in 1983. After his retirement in 2015, citizen Chris Gardner took over the position. The responsibilities of the Keeper include protecting the flagpole from unauthorized use, keeping up with maintenance, and attending related events and meetings

== The Newtown Flag Fund ==
The Newtown Flag Fund is a fund put in place by the trust of Alida Pennie Knots and governed through the Town Treasurer. Its main purposes are to ensure a flag is always flying and cover other necessary costs. The flags themselves cost money and the pole also requires occasional, small maintenance or bigger electrical work for the LED lights. Much of the services and materials are donated by the Newtown Hardware Store, Newtown Hook and Ladder, Newtown Lions Club, and others, but if those avenues fall through the fund is to be leaned on. Currently, it holds $15,739, but $10,000 of that is seed money that Gardner hopes not to tap. The fund relies heavily on donations and much of that money is raised due to the efforts of the Flagpole Stewardship Committee.
