= Nuker =

Nuker may refer to:

- Nuker, microwave oven
- Nuker, high-capacity Internet Web distribution site or topsite (warez)
- A (usually malicious) program designed to disable a computer or destroy data
- Nuker Team, the scientific group that studies galaxies
