= List of minor planets: 716001–717000 =

The following is a partial list of minor planets, running from minor-planet number 716001 through 717000, inclusive. The primary data for this and other partial lists is based on JPL's "Small-Body Orbital Elements" and data available from the Minor Planet Center. Critical list information is also provided by the MPC, unless otherwise specified from Lowell Observatory. A detailed description of the table's columns and additional sources are given on the main page including a complete list of every page in this series, and a statistical break-up on the dynamical classification of minor planets.

Also see the summary list of all named bodies in numerical and alphabetical order, and the corresponding naming citations for the number range of this particular list. New namings may only be added to this list after official publication, as the preannouncement of names is condemned by the Working Group for Small Bodies Nomenclature of the International Astronomical Union.

Near-Earth obj.	MBA (inner)	MBA (outer)	Centaur
Mars-crosser	MBA (middle)	Jupiter trojan	Trans-Neptunian obj.
Unclassified

== 716001–716100 ==
Designation			Discovery			Properties		Ref
Permanent	Provisional	Named after	Date	Site	Discoverer(s)	Category	Diam.	Ref
716001	2016 AF_{80}	—	August 28, 2014	Haleakala	Pan-STARRS 1	·	620 m	MPC · JPL
716002	2016 AM_{80}	—	October 1, 2014	Haleakala	Pan-STARRS 1	·	2.6 km	MPC · JPL
716003	2016 AO_{80}	—	January 30, 2011	Mount Lemmon	Mount Lemmon Survey	·	2.7 km	MPC · JPL
716004	2016 AQ_{80}	—	November 17, 2009	Mount Lemmon	Mount Lemmon Survey	HYG	2.4 km	MPC · JPL
716005	2016 AO_{83}	—	July 1, 2014	Haleakala	Pan-STARRS 1	·	2.5 km	MPC · JPL
716006	2016 AP_{83}	—	August 28, 2014	Haleakala	Pan-STARRS 1	·	2.6 km	MPC · JPL
716007	2016 AD_{88}	—	December 16, 2015	Mount Lemmon	Mount Lemmon Survey	EOS	1.8 km	MPC · JPL
716008	2016 AS_{88}	—	March 25, 2007	Mount Lemmon	Mount Lemmon Survey	·	2.6 km	MPC · JPL
716009	2016 AV_{88}	—	December 8, 2015	Haleakala	Pan-STARRS 1	·	2.4 km	MPC · JPL
716010	2016 AS_{89}	—	December 8, 2015	Mount Lemmon	Mount Lemmon Survey	EOS	1.8 km	MPC · JPL
716011	2016 AS_{90}	—	January 15, 2011	Mount Lemmon	Mount Lemmon Survey	·	2.5 km	MPC · JPL
716012	2016 AR_{92}	—	December 14, 2004	Socorro	LINEAR	·	3.3 km	MPC · JPL
716013	2016 AB_{94}	—	March 5, 2006	Kitt Peak	Spacewatch	·	1.5 km	MPC · JPL
716014	2016 AO_{95}	—	November 3, 2014	Mount Lemmon	Mount Lemmon Survey	·	2.5 km	MPC · JPL
716015	2016 AQ_{97}	—	February 10, 2011	Catalina	CSS	·	3.5 km	MPC · JPL
716016	2016 AE_{98}	—	November 15, 2014	Mount Lemmon	Mount Lemmon Survey	·	2.4 km	MPC · JPL
716017	2016 AT_{100}	—	January 7, 2016	Haleakala	Pan-STARRS 1	·	2.0 km	MPC · JPL
716018	2016 AK_{104}	—	November 8, 2015	Mount Lemmon	Mount Lemmon Survey	·	2.9 km	MPC · JPL
716019	2016 AQ_{106}	—	October 23, 2003	Kitt Peak	Spacewatch	·	880 m	MPC · JPL
716020	2016 AU_{107}	—	January 7, 2016	Haleakala	Pan-STARRS 1	·	3.3 km	MPC · JPL
716021	2016 AJ_{109}	—	June 8, 2012	Mount Lemmon	Mount Lemmon Survey	·	2.8 km	MPC · JPL
716022	2016 AN_{109}	—	January 7, 2016	Haleakala	Pan-STARRS 1	EOS	1.7 km	MPC · JPL
716023	2016 AZ_{109}	—	February 28, 2009	Kitt Peak	Spacewatch	·	750 m	MPC · JPL
716024	2016 AD_{111}	—	January 7, 2016	Haleakala	Pan-STARRS 1	TIR	2.4 km	MPC · JPL
716025	2016 AM_{111}	—	August 31, 2014	Haleakala	Pan-STARRS 1	·	2.2 km	MPC · JPL
716026	2016 AN_{111}	—	November 16, 2014	Mount Lemmon	Mount Lemmon Survey	·	2.2 km	MPC · JPL
716027	2016 AR_{111}	—	July 14, 2013	Haleakala	Pan-STARRS 1	EOS	1.9 km	MPC · JPL
716028	2016 AA_{113}	—	August 20, 2014	Haleakala	Pan-STARRS 1	·	2.8 km	MPC · JPL
716029	2016 AX_{113}	—	April 20, 2009	Mount Lemmon	Mount Lemmon Survey	NYS	780 m	MPC · JPL
716030	2016 AH_{114}	—	January 7, 2016	Haleakala	Pan-STARRS 1	·	3.1 km	MPC · JPL
716031	2016 AP_{114}	—	December 12, 2014	Haleakala	Pan-STARRS 1	·	2.3 km	MPC · JPL
716032	2016 AN_{115}	—	August 28, 2000	Cerro Tololo	Deep Ecliptic Survey	·	630 m	MPC · JPL
716033	2016 AX_{116}	—	October 9, 2008	Mount Lemmon	Mount Lemmon Survey	EMA	2.8 km	MPC · JPL
716034	2016 AW_{118}	—	September 3, 2013	Haleakala	Pan-STARRS 1	·	2.7 km	MPC · JPL
716035	2016 AH_{119}	—	June 14, 2012	Mount Lemmon	Mount Lemmon Survey	EOS	1.5 km	MPC · JPL
716036	2016 AW_{119}	—	October 20, 2011	Haleakala	Pan-STARRS 1	·	700 m	MPC · JPL
716037	2016 AW_{120}	—	March 30, 2011	Piszkés-tető	K. Sárneczky, Z. Kuli	·	2.3 km	MPC · JPL
716038	2016 AR_{121}	—	August 24, 2007	Kitt Peak	Spacewatch	·	2.8 km	MPC · JPL
716039	2016 AX_{122}	—	January 8, 2016	Haleakala	Pan-STARRS 1	·	2.3 km	MPC · JPL
716040	2016 AO_{124}	—	July 15, 2013	Haleakala	Pan-STARRS 1	·	2.3 km	MPC · JPL
716041	2016 AG_{130}	—	November 17, 2008	Kitt Peak	Spacewatch	VER	2.6 km	MPC · JPL
716042	2016 AA_{132}	—	October 29, 2008	Mount Lemmon	Mount Lemmon Survey	·	2.4 km	MPC · JPL
716043	2016 AR_{132}	—	January 9, 2016	Haleakala	Pan-STARRS 1	·	2.7 km	MPC · JPL
716044	2016 AH_{133}	—	January 9, 2016	Haleakala	Pan-STARRS 1	L5	7.9 km	MPC · JPL
716045	2016 AU_{134}	—	August 25, 2014	Haleakala	Pan-STARRS 1	EOS	1.3 km	MPC · JPL
716046	2016 AZ_{134}	—	October 27, 2009	Kitt Peak	Spacewatch	·	2.0 km	MPC · JPL
716047	2016 AE_{135}	—	May 20, 2010	Mount Lemmon	Mount Lemmon Survey	·	750 m	MPC · JPL
716048	2016 AQ_{135}	—	February 10, 2011	Mount Lemmon	Mount Lemmon Survey	·	2.0 km	MPC · JPL
716049	2016 AN_{137}	—	October 11, 2004	Kitt Peak	Deep Ecliptic Survey	·	1.7 km	MPC · JPL
716050	2016 AR_{138}	—	August 15, 2013	Haleakala	Pan-STARRS 1	·	2.2 km	MPC · JPL
716051	2016 AJ_{139}	—	January 9, 2016	Haleakala	Pan-STARRS 1	·	2.2 km	MPC · JPL
716052	2016 AL_{139}	—	October 6, 2008	Kitt Peak	Spacewatch	EOS	1.4 km	MPC · JPL
716053	2016 AU_{139}	—	July 29, 2008	Kitt Peak	Spacewatch	·	2.4 km	MPC · JPL
716054	2016 AE_{140}	—	January 9, 2016	Haleakala	Pan-STARRS 1	·	2.5 km	MPC · JPL
716055	2016 AY_{141}	—	November 22, 2014	Haleakala	Pan-STARRS 1	·	3.0 km	MPC · JPL
716056	2016 AN_{142}	—	January 9, 2016	Haleakala	Pan-STARRS 1	·	2.6 km	MPC · JPL
716057	2016 AU_{142}	—	October 30, 2014	Mount Lemmon	Mount Lemmon Survey	·	3.6 km	MPC · JPL
716058	2016 AS_{143}	—	May 13, 2012	Mount Lemmon	Mount Lemmon Survey	·	2.5 km	MPC · JPL
716059	2016 AB_{144}	—	April 2, 2011	Kitt Peak	Spacewatch	·	2.4 km	MPC · JPL
716060	2016 AF_{144}	—	September 5, 2008	Kitt Peak	Spacewatch	·	2.1 km	MPC · JPL
716061	2016 AL_{144}	—	October 18, 2014	Nogales	M. Schwartz, P. R. Holvorcem	·	3.3 km	MPC · JPL
716062	2016 AM_{145}	—	April 22, 2007	Kitt Peak	Spacewatch	·	1.5 km	MPC · JPL
716063	2016 AW_{145}	—	October 30, 2008	Mount Lemmon	Mount Lemmon Survey	·	3.1 km	MPC · JPL
716064	2016 AP_{146}	—	May 16, 2012	Haleakala	Pan-STARRS 1	·	3.0 km	MPC · JPL
716065	2016 AW_{146}	—	January 9, 2016	Haleakala	Pan-STARRS 1	·	2.4 km	MPC · JPL
716066	2016 AY_{146}	—	March 10, 2005	Mount Lemmon	Mount Lemmon Survey	·	2.7 km	MPC · JPL
716067	2016 AB_{147}	—	November 17, 2014	Haleakala	Pan-STARRS 1	·	2.0 km	MPC · JPL
716068	2016 AS_{153}	—	March 13, 2007	Mount Lemmon	Mount Lemmon Survey	BRA	1.2 km	MPC · JPL
716069	2016 AE_{158}	—	September 20, 2014	Haleakala	Pan-STARRS 1	·	2.7 km	MPC · JPL
716070	2016 AK_{160}	—	August 15, 2013	Haleakala	Pan-STARRS 1	·	2.2 km	MPC · JPL
716071	2016 AS_{160}	—	September 23, 2008	Kitt Peak	Spacewatch	·	2.5 km	MPC · JPL
716072	2016 AK_{161}	—	October 22, 2008	Kitt Peak	Spacewatch	·	3.2 km	MPC · JPL
716073	2016 AG_{162}	—	August 26, 2013	Haleakala	Pan-STARRS 1	·	3.1 km	MPC · JPL
716074	2016 AM_{162}	—	August 15, 2013	Haleakala	Pan-STARRS 1	·	2.6 km	MPC · JPL
716075	2016 AO_{162}	—	October 9, 2008	Mount Lemmon	Mount Lemmon Survey	·	2.5 km	MPC · JPL
716076	2016 AP_{162}	—	October 5, 2013	Haleakala	Pan-STARRS 1	·	2.8 km	MPC · JPL
716077	2016 AP_{165}	—	June 21, 2010	Mount Lemmon	Mount Lemmon Survey	L5	9.9 km	MPC · JPL
716078	2016 AB_{167}	—	August 12, 2013	Haleakala	Pan-STARRS 1	·	2.3 km	MPC · JPL
716079	2016 AQ_{168}	—	July 16, 2013	Haleakala	Pan-STARRS 1	·	2.0 km	MPC · JPL
716080	2016 AF_{169}	—	November 27, 2009	Mount Lemmon	Mount Lemmon Survey	·	1.9 km	MPC · JPL
716081	2016 AA_{170}	—	December 13, 2015	Haleakala	Pan-STARRS 1	·	2.1 km	MPC · JPL
716082	2016 AF_{170}	—	October 26, 2014	Mount Lemmon	Mount Lemmon Survey	·	2.4 km	MPC · JPL
716083	2016 AP_{176}	—	May 25, 2006	Mauna Kea	P. A. Wiegert	·	2.3 km	MPC · JPL
716084	2016 AW_{178}	—	October 28, 2014	Kitt Peak	Spacewatch	·	1.8 km	MPC · JPL
716085	2016 AE_{179}	—	October 22, 2008	Kitt Peak	Spacewatch	·	2.7 km	MPC · JPL
716086	2016 AQ_{179}	—	October 8, 2008	Mount Lemmon	Mount Lemmon Survey	·	2.4 km	MPC · JPL
716087	2016 AB_{182}	—	October 5, 2013	Mount Lemmon	Mount Lemmon Survey	·	2.9 km	MPC · JPL
716088	2016 AZ_{185}	—	December 9, 2015	Haleakala	Pan-STARRS 1	EOS	2.1 km	MPC · JPL
716089	2016 AV_{187}	—	December 6, 2015	Mount Lemmon	Mount Lemmon Survey	·	3.7 km	MPC · JPL
716090	2016 AD_{188}	—	January 14, 2011	Mount Lemmon	Mount Lemmon Survey	·	2.8 km	MPC · JPL
716091	2016 AZ_{188}	—	September 20, 2014	Haleakala	Pan-STARRS 1	·	3.1 km	MPC · JPL
716092	2016 AD_{190}	—	May 18, 2002	Kitt Peak	Spacewatch	·	2.3 km	MPC · JPL
716093	2016 AU_{190}	—	August 25, 2014	Haleakala	Pan-STARRS 1	·	1.5 km	MPC · JPL
716094	2016 AR_{192}	—	February 24, 2009	Kitt Peak	Spacewatch	NYS	790 m	MPC · JPL
716095	2016 AD_{200}	—	February 9, 2011	Mount Lemmon	Mount Lemmon Survey	H	300 m	MPC · JPL
716096	2016 AZ_{201}	—	January 3, 2016	Haleakala	Pan-STARRS 1	·	2.3 km	MPC · JPL
716097	2016 AB_{204}	—	January 4, 2016	Haleakala	Pan-STARRS 1	VER	2.1 km	MPC · JPL
716098	2016 AG_{206}	—	April 17, 2013	Cerro Tololo	DECam	V	380 m	MPC · JPL
716099	2016 AA_{214}	—	January 17, 2005	Kitt Peak	Spacewatch	·	2.0 km	MPC · JPL
716100	2016 AA_{216}	—	March 14, 2011	Mount Lemmon	Mount Lemmon Survey	EOS	1.7 km	MPC · JPL

== 716101–716200 ==
back to top

Designation			Discovery			Properties		Ref
Permanent	Provisional	Named after	Date	Site	Discoverer(s)	Category	Diam.	Ref
716101	2016 AM_{216}	—	September 5, 2008	Kitt Peak	Spacewatch	·	2.5 km	MPC · JPL
716102	2016 AQ_{216}	—	April 7, 2006	Kitt Peak	Spacewatch	·	2.3 km	MPC · JPL
716103	2016 AS_{216}	—	December 18, 2004	Mount Lemmon	Mount Lemmon Survey	·	3.0 km	MPC · JPL
716104	2016 AY_{216}	—	March 30, 2011	Haleakala	Pan-STARRS 1	VER	2.4 km	MPC · JPL
716105	2016 AL_{217}	—	February 9, 2005	Mount Lemmon	Mount Lemmon Survey	·	2.5 km	MPC · JPL
716106	2016 AN_{217}	—	August 15, 2013	Haleakala	Pan-STARRS 1	·	2.7 km	MPC · JPL
716107	2016 AO_{217}	—	January 8, 2016	Haleakala	Pan-STARRS 1	·	2.6 km	MPC · JPL
716108	2016 AR_{217}	—	September 21, 2008	Kitt Peak	Spacewatch	·	2.4 km	MPC · JPL
716109	2016 AZ_{217}	—	September 1, 2013	Haleakala	Pan-STARRS 1	·	2.7 km	MPC · JPL
716110	2016 AL_{220}	—	December 7, 2005	Catalina	CSS	·	2.3 km	MPC · JPL
716111	2016 AA_{223}	—	September 16, 2014	Haleakala	Pan-STARRS 1	·	2.1 km	MPC · JPL
716112	2016 AD_{223}	—	October 30, 2014	Haleakala	Pan-STARRS 1	EOS	1.6 km	MPC · JPL
716113	2016 AS_{223}	—	January 4, 2016	Haleakala	Pan-STARRS 1	·	1.9 km	MPC · JPL
716114	2016 AA_{224}	—	November 20, 2008	Mount Lemmon	Mount Lemmon Survey	·	2.5 km	MPC · JPL
716115	2016 AB_{224}	—	August 8, 2007	Socorro	LINEAR	·	3.2 km	MPC · JPL
716116	2016 AD_{224}	—	August 31, 2014	Haleakala	Pan-STARRS 1	·	770 m	MPC · JPL
716117	2016 AP_{224}	—	March 11, 2011	Mount Lemmon	Mount Lemmon Survey	·	2.7 km	MPC · JPL
716118	2016 AU_{227}	—	January 3, 2016	Haleakala	Pan-STARRS 1	·	2.5 km	MPC · JPL
716119	2016 AZ_{227}	—	January 3, 2016	Haleakala	Pan-STARRS 1	·	2.5 km	MPC · JPL
716120	2016 AD_{228}	—	September 27, 2008	Mount Lemmon	Mount Lemmon Survey	·	2.5 km	MPC · JPL
716121	2016 AF_{228}	—	November 22, 2009	Mount Lemmon	Mount Lemmon Survey	EOS	1.4 km	MPC · JPL
716122	2016 AG_{228}	—	October 31, 2008	Mount Lemmon	Mount Lemmon Survey	·	2.6 km	MPC · JPL
716123	2016 AS_{228}	—	November 9, 2008	Mount Lemmon	Mount Lemmon Survey	·	2.7 km	MPC · JPL
716124	2016 AT_{228}	—	October 29, 2014	Haleakala	Pan-STARRS 1	·	2.7 km	MPC · JPL
716125	2016 AD_{229}	—	November 3, 2008	Mount Lemmon	Mount Lemmon Survey	·	2.8 km	MPC · JPL
716126	2016 AK_{229}	—	December 18, 2009	Kitt Peak	Spacewatch	·	2.1 km	MPC · JPL
716127	2016 AL_{229}	—	November 1, 2008	Mount Lemmon	Mount Lemmon Survey	VER	2.5 km	MPC · JPL
716128	2016 AX_{229}	—	January 13, 2016	Kitt Peak	Spacewatch	·	2.4 km	MPC · JPL
716129	2016 AK_{231}	—	April 30, 2012	Mount Lemmon	Mount Lemmon Survey	EOS	1.4 km	MPC · JPL
716130	2016 AP_{231}	—	December 10, 2010	Mount Lemmon	Mount Lemmon Survey	KOR	1.0 km	MPC · JPL
716131	2016 AR_{231}	—	July 12, 2013	Haleakala	Pan-STARRS 1	EOS	1.5 km	MPC · JPL
716132	2016 AH_{232}	—	May 16, 2013	Haleakala	Pan-STARRS 1	·	830 m	MPC · JPL
716133	2016 AB_{233}	—	October 24, 2009	Kitt Peak	Spacewatch	EOS	1.6 km	MPC · JPL
716134	2016 AQ_{233}	—	November 17, 2009	Mount Lemmon	Mount Lemmon Survey	·	3.1 km	MPC · JPL
716135	2016 AT_{233}	—	August 21, 2014	Haleakala	Pan-STARRS 1	V	490 m	MPC · JPL
716136	2016 AC_{235}	—	July 12, 2013	Haleakala	Pan-STARRS 1	·	2.5 km	MPC · JPL
716137	2016 AS_{235}	—	January 27, 2011	Mount Lemmon	Mount Lemmon Survey	·	2.4 km	MPC · JPL
716138	2016 AU_{235}	—	January 2, 2016	Mount Lemmon	Mount Lemmon Survey	EOS	1.5 km	MPC · JPL
716139	2016 AY_{235}	—	December 18, 2015	Mount Lemmon	Mount Lemmon Survey	VER	2.1 km	MPC · JPL
716140	2016 AB_{236}	—	November 11, 2009	Kitt Peak	Spacewatch	·	2.3 km	MPC · JPL
716141	2016 AK_{236}	—	October 22, 2009	Mount Lemmon	Mount Lemmon Survey	·	2.5 km	MPC · JPL
716142	2016 AU_{236}	—	February 5, 2011	Haleakala	Pan-STARRS 1	EOS	1.7 km	MPC · JPL
716143	2016 AY_{237}	—	November 19, 2003	Kitt Peak	Spacewatch	·	2.7 km	MPC · JPL
716144	2016 AZ_{238}	—	September 22, 2003	Anderson Mesa	LONEOS	·	2.1 km	MPC · JPL
716145	2016 AX_{239}	—	September 27, 2003	Kitt Peak	Spacewatch	EOS	1.7 km	MPC · JPL
716146	2016 AA_{240}	—	October 22, 2011	Mount Lemmon	Mount Lemmon Survey	(2076)	500 m	MPC · JPL
716147	2016 AJ_{240}	—	January 10, 2011	Mount Lemmon	Mount Lemmon Survey	·	1.6 km	MPC · JPL
716148	2016 AT_{241}	—	January 3, 2016	Haleakala	Pan-STARRS 1	·	1.7 km	MPC · JPL
716149	2016 AO_{242}	—	June 9, 2007	Siding Spring	SSS	T_{j} (2.95)	4.1 km	MPC · JPL
716150	2016 AS_{242}	—	October 3, 2014	Mount Lemmon	Mount Lemmon Survey	·	2.6 km	MPC · JPL
716151	2016 AN_{243}	—	October 5, 2014	Haleakala	Pan-STARRS 1	EUP	3.0 km	MPC · JPL
716152	2016 AZ_{243}	—	September 19, 2014	Haleakala	Pan-STARRS 1	·	850 m	MPC · JPL
716153	2016 AB_{244}	—	February 10, 2011	Mount Lemmon	Mount Lemmon Survey	KOR	1.1 km	MPC · JPL
716154	2016 AX_{244}	—	July 13, 2013	Haleakala	Pan-STARRS 1	·	2.5 km	MPC · JPL
716155	2016 AO_{245}	—	December 14, 2010	Mount Lemmon	Mount Lemmon Survey	·	1.6 km	MPC · JPL
716156	2016 AB_{246}	—	January 3, 2016	Haleakala	Pan-STARRS 1	·	2.7 km	MPC · JPL
716157	2016 AG_{246}	—	May 17, 2012	Mount Lemmon	Mount Lemmon Survey	EOS	1.5 km	MPC · JPL
716158	2016 AN_{247}	—	January 4, 2016	Haleakala	Pan-STARRS 1	·	3.9 km	MPC · JPL
716159	2016 AP_{247}	—	December 2, 2010	Mount Lemmon	Mount Lemmon Survey	·	1.3 km	MPC · JPL
716160	2016 AW_{247}	—	January 4, 2016	Haleakala	Pan-STARRS 1	·	1.9 km	MPC · JPL
716161	2016 AU_{248}	—	November 26, 2009	Kitt Peak	Spacewatch	·	2.1 km	MPC · JPL
716162	2016 AO_{251}	—	February 14, 2005	Kitt Peak	Spacewatch	EOS	2.2 km	MPC · JPL
716163	2016 AZ_{251}	—	November 13, 2010	Mount Lemmon	Mount Lemmon Survey	·	1.4 km	MPC · JPL
716164	2016 AP_{253}	—	January 4, 2016	Haleakala	Pan-STARRS 1	·	3.0 km	MPC · JPL
716165	2016 AG_{255}	—	January 7, 2016	Haleakala	Pan-STARRS 1	·	2.3 km	MPC · JPL
716166	2016 AU_{255}	—	August 15, 2013	Haleakala	Pan-STARRS 1	·	2.9 km	MPC · JPL
716167	2016 AZ_{255}	—	January 7, 2016	Haleakala	Pan-STARRS 1	·	2.9 km	MPC · JPL
716168	2016 AG_{256}	—	July 14, 2013	Haleakala	Pan-STARRS 1	·	2.6 km	MPC · JPL
716169	2016 AT_{257}	—	January 7, 2016	Haleakala	Pan-STARRS 1	·	2.9 km	MPC · JPL
716170	2016 AW_{257}	—	October 28, 2014	Haleakala	Pan-STARRS 1	(31811)	2.2 km	MPC · JPL
716171	2016 AM_{259}	—	November 22, 2014	Haleakala	Pan-STARRS 1	·	1.2 km	MPC · JPL
716172	2016 AH_{260}	—	August 9, 2013	Haleakala	Pan-STARRS 1	·	2.6 km	MPC · JPL
716173	2016 AE_{261}	—	January 8, 2016	Haleakala	Pan-STARRS 1	EOS	2.0 km	MPC · JPL
716174	2016 AF_{261}	—	December 23, 2014	Mount Lemmon	Mount Lemmon Survey	VER	2.4 km	MPC · JPL
716175	2016 AX_{261}	—	January 8, 2016	Haleakala	Pan-STARRS 1	·	3.2 km	MPC · JPL
716176	2016 AF_{262}	—	January 8, 2016	Haleakala	Pan-STARRS 1	EOS	1.8 km	MPC · JPL
716177	2016 AA_{263}	—	December 28, 1998	Kitt Peak	Spacewatch	·	3.1 km	MPC · JPL
716178	2016 AE_{264}	—	October 26, 2011	Haleakala	Pan-STARRS 1	V	440 m	MPC · JPL
716179	2016 AJ_{265}	—	April 26, 2011	Mount Lemmon	Mount Lemmon Survey	·	2.8 km	MPC · JPL
716180	2016 AO_{265}	—	January 20, 2015	Mount Lemmon	Mount Lemmon Survey	·	2.9 km	MPC · JPL
716181	2016 AS_{266}	—	October 1, 2010	Mount Lemmon	Mount Lemmon Survey	·	820 m	MPC · JPL
716182	2016 AV_{266}	—	December 2, 2005	Mauna Kea	A. Boattini	·	2.1 km	MPC · JPL
716183	2016 AX_{267}	—	November 17, 2014	Haleakala	Pan-STARRS 1	·	3.1 km	MPC · JPL
716184	2016 AY_{267}	—	October 28, 2008	Kitt Peak	Spacewatch	·	3.0 km	MPC · JPL
716185	2016 AH_{268}	—	September 30, 2003	Apache Point	SDSS Collaboration	·	2.4 km	MPC · JPL
716186	2016 AT_{268}	—	October 22, 2009	Mount Lemmon	Mount Lemmon Survey	EOS	1.7 km	MPC · JPL
716187	2016 AZ_{268}	—	December 10, 2014	Mount Lemmon	Mount Lemmon Survey	·	3.3 km	MPC · JPL
716188	2016 AG_{270}	—	November 17, 2014	Mount Lemmon	Mount Lemmon Survey	EOS	1.7 km	MPC · JPL
716189	2016 AK_{270}	—	February 5, 2011	Mount Lemmon	Mount Lemmon Survey	EOS	1.4 km	MPC · JPL
716190	2016 AS_{270}	—	October 8, 2008	Mount Lemmon	Mount Lemmon Survey	·	2.3 km	MPC · JPL
716191	2016 AW_{270}	—	September 4, 2008	Kitt Peak	Spacewatch	·	2.2 km	MPC · JPL
716192	2016 AX_{270}	—	September 23, 2011	Haleakala	Pan-STARRS 1	·	560 m	MPC · JPL
716193	2016 AT_{271}	—	September 3, 2013	Haleakala	Pan-STARRS 1	·	3.1 km	MPC · JPL
716194	2016 AW_{271}	—	January 14, 2016	Haleakala	Pan-STARRS 1	·	530 m	MPC · JPL
716195	2016 AV_{272}	—	February 24, 2006	Kitt Peak	Spacewatch	EOS	1.8 km	MPC · JPL
716196	2016 AW_{273}	—	January 14, 2016	Haleakala	Pan-STARRS 1	·	2.2 km	MPC · JPL
716197	2016 AE_{274}	—	January 14, 2016	Haleakala	Pan-STARRS 1	V	500 m	MPC · JPL
716198	2016 AS_{275}	—	October 31, 2008	Kitt Peak	Spacewatch	VER	2.5 km	MPC · JPL
716199	2016 AR_{301}	—	January 13, 2016	Kitt Peak	Spacewatch	·	1.9 km	MPC · JPL
716200	2016 AY_{301}	—	January 13, 2016	Haleakala	Pan-STARRS 1	·	2.3 km	MPC · JPL

== 716201–716300 ==
back to top

Designation			Discovery			Properties		Ref
Permanent	Provisional	Named after	Date	Site	Discoverer(s)	Category	Diam.	Ref
716201	2016 AE_{305}	—	January 3, 2016	Haleakala	Pan-STARRS 1	VER	2.1 km	MPC · JPL
716202	2016 AN_{305}	—	January 3, 2016	Mount Lemmon	Mount Lemmon Survey	·	2.5 km	MPC · JPL
716203	2016 AV_{305}	—	January 7, 2016	Haleakala	Pan-STARRS 1	·	720 m	MPC · JPL
716204	2016 AJ_{307}	—	January 12, 2016	Haleakala	Pan-STARRS 1	·	2.3 km	MPC · JPL
716205	2016 AH_{309}	—	January 4, 2016	Haleakala	Pan-STARRS 1	·	2.4 km	MPC · JPL
716206	2016 AQ_{311}	—	January 3, 2016	Mount Lemmon	Mount Lemmon Survey	·	2.0 km	MPC · JPL
716207	2016 AV_{311}	—	January 14, 2016	Mount Lemmon	Mount Lemmon Survey	PHO	800 m	MPC · JPL
716208	2016 AD_{315}	—	January 14, 2016	Haleakala	Pan-STARRS 1	·	650 m	MPC · JPL
716209	2016 AL_{315}	—	January 7, 2016	Haleakala	Pan-STARRS 1	·	1.4 km	MPC · JPL
716210	2016 AK_{319}	—	November 18, 2014	Mount Lemmon	Mount Lemmon Survey	·	2.3 km	MPC · JPL
716211	2016 AS_{321}	—	January 4, 2016	Haleakala	Pan-STARRS 1	·	2.6 km	MPC · JPL
716212	2016 AV_{324}	—	January 12, 2016	Haleakala	Pan-STARRS 1	TIR	2.3 km	MPC · JPL
716213	2016 AH_{325}	—	January 3, 2016	Mount Lemmon	Mount Lemmon Survey	KOR	1.0 km	MPC · JPL
716214	2016 AM_{326}	—	January 4, 2016	Haleakala	Pan-STARRS 1	·	2.5 km	MPC · JPL
716215	2016 AK_{327}	—	January 2, 2016	Haleakala	Pan-STARRS 1	·	2.2 km	MPC · JPL
716216	2016 AD_{329}	—	January 4, 2016	Haleakala	Pan-STARRS 1	·	2.2 km	MPC · JPL
716217	2016 AF_{337}	—	January 3, 2016	Haleakala	Pan-STARRS 1	·	2.9 km	MPC · JPL
716218	2016 AT_{337}	—	January 12, 2016	Haleakala	Pan-STARRS 1	·	2.3 km	MPC · JPL
716219	2016 AU_{337}	—	January 14, 2016	Haleakala	Pan-STARRS 1	·	2.4 km	MPC · JPL
716220	2016 AV_{344}	—	July 27, 2011	Haleakala	Pan-STARRS 1	·	520 m	MPC · JPL
716221	2016 AS_{348}	—	January 13, 2016	Haleakala	Pan-STARRS 1	·	2.6 km	MPC · JPL
716222	2016 AN_{351}	—	January 12, 2016	Haleakala	Pan-STARRS 1	·	2.3 km	MPC · JPL
716223	2016 AD_{364}	—	January 5, 2016	Haleakala	Pan-STARRS 1	·	3.1 km	MPC · JPL
716224	2016 AL_{365}	—	January 9, 2016	Haleakala	Pan-STARRS 1	·	2.0 km	MPC · JPL
716225	2016 AR_{372}	—	January 14, 2016	Kitt Peak	Spacewatch	·	2.1 km	MPC · JPL
716226	2016 AT_{380}	—	January 2, 2016	Mount Lemmon	Mount Lemmon Survey	EOS	1.5 km	MPC · JPL
716227	2016 AM_{382}	—	November 17, 2014	Haleakala	Pan-STARRS 1	·	2.6 km	MPC · JPL
716228	2016 AQ_{392}	—	January 14, 2016	Haleakala	Pan-STARRS 1	·	2.7 km	MPC · JPL
716229	2016 AE_{393}	—	January 4, 2016	Haleakala	Pan-STARRS 1	·	2.7 km	MPC · JPL
716230	2016 BT_{5}	—	November 3, 2008	Kitt Peak	Spacewatch	·	2.9 km	MPC · JPL
716231	2016 BS_{10}	—	September 14, 2013	Mount Lemmon	Mount Lemmon Survey	·	2.6 km	MPC · JPL
716232	2016 BM_{13}	—	December 6, 2015	Mount Lemmon	Mount Lemmon Survey	TIR	2.7 km	MPC · JPL
716233	2016 BQ_{16}	—	February 1, 2005	Kitt Peak	Spacewatch	THM	2.1 km	MPC · JPL
716234	2016 BJ_{21}	—	February 8, 2011	Mount Lemmon	Mount Lemmon Survey	EOS	1.8 km	MPC · JPL
716235	2016 BE_{22}	—	January 16, 2005	Kitt Peak	Spacewatch	·	3.1 km	MPC · JPL
716236	2016 BG_{27}	—	August 12, 2013	Haleakala	Pan-STARRS 1	·	2.8 km	MPC · JPL
716237	2016 BP_{27}	—	September 25, 2008	Mount Lemmon	Mount Lemmon Survey	EOS	1.6 km	MPC · JPL
716238	2016 BA_{31}	—	November 21, 2008	Mount Lemmon	Mount Lemmon Survey	·	610 m	MPC · JPL
716239	2016 BM_{33}	—	July 15, 2013	Haleakala	Pan-STARRS 1	·	1.7 km	MPC · JPL
716240	2016 BB_{34}	—	April 17, 2013	Haleakala	Pan-STARRS 1	·	830 m	MPC · JPL
716241	2016 BO_{34}	—	September 10, 2007	Kitt Peak	Spacewatch	·	710 m	MPC · JPL
716242	2016 BO_{35}	—	January 7, 2016	Haleakala	Pan-STARRS 1	·	820 m	MPC · JPL
716243	2016 BH_{36}	—	January 13, 1999	Kitt Peak	Spacewatch	·	3.1 km	MPC · JPL
716244	2016 BR_{36}	—	October 9, 2004	Kitt Peak	Spacewatch	·	660 m	MPC · JPL
716245	2016 BO_{37}	—	August 30, 2014	Haleakala	Pan-STARRS 1	·	1.5 km	MPC · JPL
716246	2016 BR_{38}	—	April 21, 2012	Mount Lemmon	Mount Lemmon Survey	EOS	1.6 km	MPC · JPL
716247	2016 BO_{42}	—	June 1, 2012	Mount Lemmon	Mount Lemmon Survey	·	2.5 km	MPC · JPL
716248	2016 BV_{43}	—	December 19, 2004	Mount Lemmon	Mount Lemmon Survey	EOS	1.7 km	MPC · JPL
716249	2016 BZ_{46}	—	April 1, 2011	Mount Lemmon	Mount Lemmon Survey	·	2.6 km	MPC · JPL
716250	2016 BW_{49}	—	December 19, 2004	Mount Lemmon	Mount Lemmon Survey	·	2.5 km	MPC · JPL
716251	2016 BN_{50}	—	December 6, 2015	Mount Lemmon	Mount Lemmon Survey	VER	2.4 km	MPC · JPL
716252	2016 BX_{50}	—	January 31, 2006	Kitt Peak	Spacewatch	·	1.7 km	MPC · JPL
716253	2016 BR_{51}	—	August 9, 2013	Haleakala	Pan-STARRS 1	VER	2.4 km	MPC · JPL
716254	2016 BY_{54}	—	September 13, 2007	Mount Lemmon	Mount Lemmon Survey	·	880 m	MPC · JPL
716255	2016 BC_{55}	—	March 12, 2011	Mount Lemmon	Mount Lemmon Survey	·	2.8 km	MPC · JPL
716256	2016 BF_{55}	—	February 25, 2011	Mount Lemmon	Mount Lemmon Survey	EMA	2.3 km	MPC · JPL
716257	2016 BY_{56}	—	August 30, 2002	Palomar	NEAT	·	2.1 km	MPC · JPL
716258	2016 BE_{59}	—	October 9, 2008	Mount Lemmon	Mount Lemmon Survey	·	2.8 km	MPC · JPL
716259	2016 BM_{59}	—	January 8, 2016	Haleakala	Pan-STARRS 1	·	810 m	MPC · JPL
716260 Baybayan	2016 BK_{61}	Baybayan	November 30, 2000	Kitt Peak	N. Samarasinha, T. Lauer	·	760 m	MPC · JPL
716261	2016 BV_{61}	—	December 21, 2006	Mount Lemmon	Mount Lemmon Survey	·	1.6 km	MPC · JPL
716262	2016 BX_{61}	—	December 18, 2015	Mount Lemmon	Mount Lemmon Survey	·	2.3 km	MPC · JPL
716263	2016 BJ_{62}	—	October 1, 2014	Haleakala	Pan-STARRS 1	·	2.4 km	MPC · JPL
716264	2016 BL_{67}	—	January 20, 2016	Haleakala	Pan-STARRS 1	·	3.0 km	MPC · JPL
716265	2016 BD_{69}	—	October 28, 2014	Haleakala	Pan-STARRS 1	·	1.9 km	MPC · JPL
716266	2016 BR_{72}	—	April 7, 2006	Kitt Peak	Spacewatch	·	2.1 km	MPC · JPL
716267	2016 BX_{72}	—	February 2, 2005	Kitt Peak	Spacewatch	HYG	2.8 km	MPC · JPL
716268	2016 BO_{74}	—	January 14, 2016	Haleakala	Pan-STARRS 1	·	2.3 km	MPC · JPL
716269	2016 BS_{74}	—	October 29, 2014	Haleakala	Pan-STARRS 1	·	2.1 km	MPC · JPL
716270	2016 BG_{75}	—	May 8, 2013	Haleakala	Pan-STARRS 1	·	810 m	MPC · JPL
716271	2016 BU_{78}	—	January 31, 2016	Haleakala	Pan-STARRS 1	·	2.0 km	MPC · JPL
716272	2016 BM_{79}	—	November 20, 2014	Haleakala	Pan-STARRS 1	·	3.1 km	MPC · JPL
716273	2016 BP_{80}	—	February 1, 2009	Mount Lemmon	Mount Lemmon Survey	·	600 m	MPC · JPL
716274	2016 BZ_{87}	—	March 8, 2005	Mount Lemmon	Mount Lemmon Survey	·	900 m	MPC · JPL
716275	2016 BB_{88}	—	July 14, 2013	Haleakala	Pan-STARRS 1	EOS	1.6 km	MPC · JPL
716276	2016 BD_{88}	—	February 17, 2005	Gnosca	S. Sposetti	·	2.4 km	MPC · JPL
716277	2016 BD_{89}	—	September 22, 2014	Haleakala	Pan-STARRS 1	·	2.8 km	MPC · JPL
716278	2016 BD_{90}	—	November 10, 2014	Haleakala	Pan-STARRS 1	·	2.3 km	MPC · JPL
716279	2016 BF_{90}	—	October 2, 2013	Mount Lemmon	Mount Lemmon Survey	·	2.5 km	MPC · JPL
716280	2016 BQ_{90}	—	January 18, 2016	Haleakala	Pan-STARRS 1	·	1.9 km	MPC · JPL
716281	2016 BD_{92}	—	September 3, 2013	Haleakala	Pan-STARRS 1	·	1.8 km	MPC · JPL
716282	2016 BF_{92}	—	November 30, 2008	Mount Lemmon	Mount Lemmon Survey	·	2.9 km	MPC · JPL
716283	2016 BO_{92}	—	November 20, 2014	Mount Lemmon	Mount Lemmon Survey	·	2.3 km	MPC · JPL
716284	2016 BV_{92}	—	January 17, 2016	Haleakala	Pan-STARRS 1	·	790 m	MPC · JPL
716285	2016 BZ_{94}	—	September 3, 2013	Catalina	CSS	·	3.6 km	MPC · JPL
716286	2016 BC_{96}	—	October 22, 2008	Kitt Peak	Spacewatch	·	3.0 km	MPC · JPL
716287	2016 BX_{97}	—	August 13, 2013	Kitt Peak	Spacewatch	·	2.4 km	MPC · JPL
716288	2016 BB_{98}	—	January 17, 2016	Haleakala	Pan-STARRS 1	TIR	2.8 km	MPC · JPL
716289	2016 BQ_{102}	—	November 18, 2014	Haleakala	Pan-STARRS 1	URS	2.5 km	MPC · JPL
716290	2016 BS_{102}	—	September 15, 2013	Mount Lemmon	Mount Lemmon Survey	·	3.6 km	MPC · JPL
716291	2016 BG_{103}	—	January 29, 2016	Mount Lemmon	Mount Lemmon Survey	EUN	1.0 km	MPC · JPL
716292	2016 BM_{104}	—	January 31, 2016	Haleakala	Pan-STARRS 1	·	2.5 km	MPC · JPL
716293	2016 BS_{105}	—	March 25, 2011	Haleakala	Pan-STARRS 1	EOS	1.6 km	MPC · JPL
716294	2016 BL_{107}	—	January 30, 2016	Mount Lemmon	Mount Lemmon Survey	·	810 m	MPC · JPL
716295	2016 BL_{109}	—	January 29, 2016	Mount Lemmon	Mount Lemmon Survey	·	2.2 km	MPC · JPL
716296	2016 BN_{111}	—	January 16, 2016	Haleakala	Pan-STARRS 1	·	2.2 km	MPC · JPL
716297	2016 BO_{111}	—	January 31, 2016	Haleakala	Pan-STARRS 1	·	3.3 km	MPC · JPL
716298	2016 BR_{111}	—	January 17, 2016	Haleakala	Pan-STARRS 1	EOS	1.3 km	MPC · JPL
716299	2016 BC_{118}	—	January 31, 2016	Mount Lemmon	Mount Lemmon Survey	·	2.5 km	MPC · JPL
716300	2016 BO_{119}	—	January 28, 2016	Mount Lemmon	Mount Lemmon Survey	KOR	1.2 km	MPC · JPL

== 716301–716400 ==
back to top

Designation			Discovery			Properties		Ref
Permanent	Provisional	Named after	Date	Site	Discoverer(s)	Category	Diam.	Ref
716301	2016 BJ_{123}	—	January 18, 2016	Mount Lemmon	Mount Lemmon Survey	·	2.3 km	MPC · JPL
716302	2016 BM_{123}	—	January 18, 2016	Haleakala	Pan-STARRS 1	VER	2.2 km	MPC · JPL
716303	2016 BZ_{123}	—	January 30, 2016	Mount Lemmon	Mount Lemmon Survey	VER	1.7 km	MPC · JPL
716304	2016 BT_{125}	—	October 1, 2014	Mount Lemmon	Mount Lemmon Survey	·	670 m	MPC · JPL
716305	2016 BW_{127}	—	October 31, 2005	Mauna Kea	A. Boattini	L5	6.5 km	MPC · JPL
716306	2016 BN_{130}	—	January 30, 2016	Mount Lemmon	Mount Lemmon Survey	V	570 m	MPC · JPL
716307	2016 BR_{132}	—	January 31, 2016	Haleakala	Pan-STARRS 1	·	2.8 km	MPC · JPL
716308	2016 BH_{134}	—	January 30, 2016	Mount Lemmon	Mount Lemmon Survey	VER	1.9 km	MPC · JPL
716309	2016 BN_{135}	—	January 17, 2016	Haleakala	Pan-STARRS 1	·	2.7 km	MPC · JPL
716310	2016 BY_{140}	—	January 19, 2016	Mount Lemmon	Mount Lemmon Survey	KOR	1.0 km	MPC · JPL
716311	2016 CG	—	July 1, 2013	Haleakala	Pan-STARRS 1	·	3.5 km	MPC · JPL
716312	2016 CM	—	November 26, 2014	Mount Lemmon	Mount Lemmon Survey	·	3.1 km	MPC · JPL
716313	2016 CY	—	November 27, 2014	Haleakala	Pan-STARRS 1	VER	2.7 km	MPC · JPL
716314	2016 CK_{1}	—	April 20, 2004	Kitt Peak	Spacewatch	·	900 m	MPC · JPL
716315	2016 CP_{1}	—	February 4, 2000	Kitt Peak	Spacewatch	·	2.5 km	MPC · JPL
716316	2016 CH_{2}	—	September 15, 2010	Mount Lemmon	Mount Lemmon Survey	·	1.0 km	MPC · JPL
716317	2016 CG_{3}	—	August 12, 2013	Haleakala	Pan-STARRS 1	·	2.6 km	MPC · JPL
716318	2016 CS_{3}	—	October 20, 1995	Kitt Peak	Spacewatch	·	860 m	MPC · JPL
716319	2016 CV_{3}	—	August 29, 2002	Palomar	NEAT	·	2.7 km	MPC · JPL
716320	2016 CK_{6}	—	December 11, 2010	Mount Lemmon	Mount Lemmon Survey	EOS	1.5 km	MPC · JPL
716321	2016 CQ_{6}	—	September 2, 2014	Haleakala	Pan-STARRS 1	HNS	880 m	MPC · JPL
716322	2016 CS_{6}	—	December 18, 2014	Haleakala	Pan-STARRS 1	EOS	1.4 km	MPC · JPL
716323	2016 CU_{7}	—	January 16, 2005	Kitt Peak	Spacewatch	·	2.9 km	MPC · JPL
716324	2016 CA_{8}	—	November 22, 2014	Haleakala	Pan-STARRS 1	EOS	1.6 km	MPC · JPL
716325	2016 CB_{8}	—	November 4, 2004	Kitt Peak	Spacewatch	·	620 m	MPC · JPL
716326	2016 CN_{9}	—	December 20, 2009	Kitt Peak	Spacewatch	ELF	3.4 km	MPC · JPL
716327	2016 CZ_{9}	—	April 21, 2009	Mount Lemmon	Mount Lemmon Survey	·	900 m	MPC · JPL
716328	2016 CJ_{10}	—	August 7, 2013	Kitt Peak	Spacewatch	·	3.3 km	MPC · JPL
716329	2016 CV_{10}	—	November 27, 2010	Mount Lemmon	Mount Lemmon Survey	·	1.2 km	MPC · JPL
716330	2016 CW_{10}	—	May 18, 2012	Mount Lemmon	Mount Lemmon Survey	·	3.2 km	MPC · JPL
716331	2016 CQ_{11}	—	January 15, 2016	Haleakala	Pan-STARRS 1	·	3.7 km	MPC · JPL
716332	2016 CF_{12}	—	August 9, 2013	Haleakala	Pan-STARRS 1	·	2.5 km	MPC · JPL
716333	2016 CT_{12}	—	January 16, 2016	Haleakala	Pan-STARRS 1	·	1.5 km	MPC · JPL
716334	2016 CU_{12}	—	February 13, 2002	Apache Point	SDSS	·	970 m	MPC · JPL
716335	2016 CQ_{14}	—	August 8, 2013	Haleakala	Pan-STARRS 1	·	1.8 km	MPC · JPL
716336	2016 CD_{17}	—	July 14, 2013	Haleakala	Pan-STARRS 1	·	2.7 km	MPC · JPL
716337	2016 CO_{18}	—	August 4, 2013	Haleakala	Pan-STARRS 1	·	2.5 km	MPC · JPL
716338	2016 CQ_{21}	—	February 5, 2011	Haleakala	Pan-STARRS 1	EOS	1.7 km	MPC · JPL
716339	2016 CJ_{22}	—	December 29, 2005	Kitt Peak	Spacewatch	KOR	1.1 km	MPC · JPL
716340	2016 CF_{23}	—	January 9, 2016	Haleakala	Pan-STARRS 1	·	890 m	MPC · JPL
716341	2016 CM_{23}	—	October 11, 2010	Mount Lemmon	Mount Lemmon Survey	·	1.5 km	MPC · JPL
716342	2016 CN_{26}	—	October 22, 2003	Apache Point	SDSS Collaboration	EOS	1.7 km	MPC · JPL
716343	2016 CA_{27}	—	October 25, 2014	Mount Lemmon	Mount Lemmon Survey	V	590 m	MPC · JPL
716344	2016 CZ_{27}	—	September 29, 2008	Kitt Peak	Spacewatch	EOS	1.5 km	MPC · JPL
716345	2016 CQ_{33}	—	October 28, 2014	Haleakala	Pan-STARRS 1	·	2.6 km	MPC · JPL
716346	2016 CK_{34}	—	September 4, 2008	Kitt Peak	Spacewatch	VER	2.0 km	MPC · JPL
716347	2016 CE_{37}	—	March 8, 2005	Mount Lemmon	Mount Lemmon Survey	·	2.4 km	MPC · JPL
716348	2016 CF_{38}	—	February 3, 2016	Haleakala	Pan-STARRS 1	·	1.5 km	MPC · JPL
716349	2016 CP_{40}	—	January 31, 2009	Mount Lemmon	Mount Lemmon Survey	·	780 m	MPC · JPL
716350	2016 CG_{41}	—	July 14, 2013	Haleakala	Pan-STARRS 1	EOS	1.6 km	MPC · JPL
716351	2016 CU_{43}	—	September 24, 2011	Haleakala	Pan-STARRS 1	·	590 m	MPC · JPL
716352	2016 CB_{44}	—	September 20, 2014	Haleakala	Pan-STARRS 1	VER	2.1 km	MPC · JPL
716353	2016 CT_{44}	—	August 14, 2013	Haleakala	Pan-STARRS 1	·	2.7 km	MPC · JPL
716354	2016 CU_{44}	—	May 15, 2013	Haleakala	Pan-STARRS 1	·	860 m	MPC · JPL
716355	2016 CX_{45}	—	September 29, 2008	Mount Lemmon	Mount Lemmon Survey	·	2.0 km	MPC · JPL
716356	2016 CO_{46}	—	July 13, 2013	Haleakala	Pan-STARRS 1	·	2.2 km	MPC · JPL
716357	2016 CV_{48}	—	September 4, 2008	Kitt Peak	Spacewatch	·	2.6 km	MPC · JPL
716358	2016 CB_{49}	—	September 20, 2014	Haleakala	Pan-STARRS 1	·	2.4 km	MPC · JPL
716359	2016 CC_{49}	—	October 9, 2008	Mount Lemmon	Mount Lemmon Survey	·	2.6 km	MPC · JPL
716360	2016 CK_{49}	—	March 24, 2006	Mount Lemmon	Mount Lemmon Survey	EOS	1.4 km	MPC · JPL
716361	2016 CA_{50}	—	April 27, 2012	Haleakala	Pan-STARRS 1	·	2.1 km	MPC · JPL
716362	2016 CD_{50}	—	November 21, 2014	Haleakala	Pan-STARRS 1	VER	2.4 km	MPC · JPL
716363	2016 CN_{52}	—	January 30, 2011	Mount Lemmon	Mount Lemmon Survey	·	1.3 km	MPC · JPL
716364	2016 CX_{53}	—	January 8, 2016	Haleakala	Pan-STARRS 1	·	2.9 km	MPC · JPL
716365	2016 CY_{54}	—	March 3, 2005	Kitt Peak	Spacewatch	·	2.3 km	MPC · JPL
716366	2016 CQ_{56}	—	November 20, 2014	Mount Lemmon	Mount Lemmon Survey	EOS	1.4 km	MPC · JPL
716367	2016 CV_{59}	—	March 26, 2011	Mount Lemmon	Mount Lemmon Survey	·	2.0 km	MPC · JPL
716368	2016 CZ_{61}	—	September 24, 2008	Kitt Peak	Spacewatch	·	2.9 km	MPC · JPL
716369	2016 CA_{62}	—	September 23, 2008	Kitt Peak	Spacewatch	·	3.1 km	MPC · JPL
716370	2016 CK_{67}	—	October 28, 2014	Haleakala	Pan-STARRS 1	·	2.1 km	MPC · JPL
716371	2016 CR_{70}	—	October 1, 2009	Mount Lemmon	Mount Lemmon Survey	·	2.4 km	MPC · JPL
716372	2016 CK_{71}	—	February 5, 2011	Mount Lemmon	Mount Lemmon Survey	·	2.5 km	MPC · JPL
716373	2016 CX_{71}	—	January 1, 2016	Haleakala	Pan-STARRS 1	·	2.5 km	MPC · JPL
716374	2016 CG_{75}	—	September 4, 2003	Kitt Peak	Spacewatch	·	1.1 km	MPC · JPL
716375	2016 CX_{75}	—	April 19, 2012	Mount Lemmon	Mount Lemmon Survey	EOS	1.6 km	MPC · JPL
716376	2016 CH_{76}	—	February 20, 2006	Kitt Peak	Spacewatch	·	2.8 km	MPC · JPL
716377	2016 CU_{76}	—	July 1, 2013	Haleakala	Pan-STARRS 1	·	2.5 km	MPC · JPL
716378	2016 CW_{76}	—	September 23, 2008	Mount Lemmon	Mount Lemmon Survey	·	1.9 km	MPC · JPL
716379	2016 CA_{79}	—	September 2, 2008	Kitt Peak	Spacewatch	EOS	1.5 km	MPC · JPL
716380	2016 CQ_{79}	—	September 1, 2013	Mount Lemmon	Mount Lemmon Survey	·	2.3 km	MPC · JPL
716381	2016 CJ_{81}	—	March 2, 2011	Kitt Peak	Spacewatch	·	2.7 km	MPC · JPL
716382	2016 CM_{81}	—	September 29, 2008	Mount Lemmon	Mount Lemmon Survey	·	2.8 km	MPC · JPL
716383	2016 CA_{84}	—	February 5, 2016	Haleakala	Pan-STARRS 1	·	2.3 km	MPC · JPL
716384	2016 CB_{85}	—	February 5, 2016	Haleakala	Pan-STARRS 1	·	2.5 km	MPC · JPL
716385	2016 CZ_{87}	—	April 15, 2013	Haleakala	Pan-STARRS 1	·	770 m	MPC · JPL
716386	2016 CC_{88}	—	November 30, 2014	Kitt Peak	Spacewatch	·	2.5 km	MPC · JPL
716387	2016 CO_{89}	—	December 13, 2001	Palomar	NEAT	·	710 m	MPC · JPL
716388	2016 CX_{89}	—	February 24, 2009	Catalina	CSS	·	1.1 km	MPC · JPL
716389	2016 CQ_{90}	—	February 5, 2016	Haleakala	Pan-STARRS 1	·	590 m	MPC · JPL
716390	2016 CA_{91}	—	October 25, 2014	Mount Lemmon	Mount Lemmon Survey	VER	2.0 km	MPC · JPL
716391	2016 CQ_{91}	—	September 12, 2007	Mount Lemmon	Mount Lemmon Survey	·	2.7 km	MPC · JPL
716392	2016 CY_{91}	—	October 2, 2008	Kitt Peak	Spacewatch	·	2.1 km	MPC · JPL
716393	2016 CN_{92}	—	November 18, 2014	Kitt Peak	Spacewatch	(159)	2.1 km	MPC · JPL
716394	2016 CM_{93}	—	February 5, 2016	Haleakala	Pan-STARRS 1	·	730 m	MPC · JPL
716395	2016 CG_{94}	—	September 21, 2008	Mount Lemmon	Mount Lemmon Survey	·	2.3 km	MPC · JPL
716396	2016 CK_{94}	—	April 27, 2012	Haleakala	Pan-STARRS 1	·	2.1 km	MPC · JPL
716397	2016 CN_{94}	—	September 28, 2008	Mount Lemmon	Mount Lemmon Survey	·	2.1 km	MPC · JPL
716398	2016 CO_{94}	—	November 28, 2014	Catalina	CSS	·	2.6 km	MPC · JPL
716399	2016 CZ_{95}	—	January 4, 2016	Haleakala	Pan-STARRS 1	·	760 m	MPC · JPL
716400	2016 CR_{97}	—	November 17, 2014	Haleakala	Pan-STARRS 1	EOS	1.5 km	MPC · JPL

== 716401–716500 ==
back to top

Designation			Discovery			Properties		Ref
Permanent	Provisional	Named after	Date	Site	Discoverer(s)	Category	Diam.	Ref
716401	2016 CW_{99}	—	September 5, 2008	Kitt Peak	Spacewatch	EOS	1.7 km	MPC · JPL
716402	2016 CB_{101}	—	November 16, 2014	Kitt Peak	Spacewatch	·	2.8 km	MPC · JPL
716403	2016 CZ_{101}	—	February 5, 2016	Haleakala	Pan-STARRS 1	·	1.9 km	MPC · JPL
716404	2016 CO_{103}	—	July 12, 2013	Haleakala	Pan-STARRS 1	·	2.3 km	MPC · JPL
716405	2016 CE_{105}	—	December 18, 2009	Mount Lemmon	Mount Lemmon Survey	·	3.2 km	MPC · JPL
716406	2016 CS_{105}	—	December 9, 2015	Haleakala	Pan-STARRS 1	·	2.6 km	MPC · JPL
716407	2016 CL_{106}	—	September 3, 2002	Palomar	NEAT	TIR	2.6 km	MPC · JPL
716408	2016 CN_{107}	—	March 1, 2009	Mount Lemmon	Mount Lemmon Survey	·	880 m	MPC · JPL
716409	2016 CA_{108}	—	February 5, 2016	Haleakala	Pan-STARRS 1	·	2.8 km	MPC · JPL
716410	2016 CD_{110}	—	February 5, 2016	Haleakala	Pan-STARRS 1	·	2.1 km	MPC · JPL
716411	2016 CJ_{111}	—	September 13, 2007	Mount Lemmon	Mount Lemmon Survey	·	2.9 km	MPC · JPL
716412	2016 CB_{113}	—	October 23, 2008	Kitt Peak	Spacewatch	·	2.2 km	MPC · JPL
716413	2016 CE_{113}	—	October 25, 2014	Haleakala	Pan-STARRS 1	EMA	2.5 km	MPC · JPL
716414	2016 CD_{114}	—	September 24, 2008	Kitt Peak	Spacewatch	EOS	1.5 km	MPC · JPL
716415	2016 CF_{114}	—	October 1, 2008	Mount Lemmon	Mount Lemmon Survey	·	2.4 km	MPC · JPL
716416	2016 CA_{115}	—	September 29, 2008	Mount Lemmon	Mount Lemmon Survey	VER	2.2 km	MPC · JPL
716417	2016 CC_{115}	—	October 30, 2008	Mount Lemmon	Mount Lemmon Survey	VER	1.9 km	MPC · JPL
716418	2016 CO_{115}	—	October 20, 2011	Kitt Peak	Spacewatch	·	630 m	MPC · JPL
716419	2016 CH_{116}	—	December 9, 2015	Haleakala	Pan-STARRS 1	·	830 m	MPC · JPL
716420	2016 CJ_{116}	—	November 22, 2014	Haleakala	Pan-STARRS 1	·	2.4 km	MPC · JPL
716421	2016 CL_{117}	—	December 9, 2015	Haleakala	Pan-STARRS 1	·	2.2 km	MPC · JPL
716422	2016 CQ_{119}	—	July 16, 2013	Haleakala	Pan-STARRS 1	·	1.9 km	MPC · JPL
716423	2016 CX_{122}	—	July 28, 2013	Kitt Peak	Spacewatch	·	2.6 km	MPC · JPL
716424	2016 CY_{122}	—	October 31, 2008	Mount Lemmon	Mount Lemmon Survey	VER	2.5 km	MPC · JPL
716425	2016 CE_{124}	—	August 21, 2014	Haleakala	Pan-STARRS 1	V	430 m	MPC · JPL
716426	2016 CN_{124}	—	March 6, 2011	Kitt Peak	Spacewatch	·	2.9 km	MPC · JPL
716427	2016 CS_{124}	—	January 14, 2016	Haleakala	Pan-STARRS 1	·	2.5 km	MPC · JPL
716428	2016 CN_{128}	—	June 7, 2013	Haleakala	Pan-STARRS 1	·	820 m	MPC · JPL
716429	2016 CA_{129}	—	September 23, 2014	Haleakala	Pan-STARRS 1	·	1.6 km	MPC · JPL
716430	2016 CC_{130}	—	February 2, 2006	Kitt Peak	Spacewatch	·	660 m	MPC · JPL
716431	2016 CF_{130}	—	September 14, 2007	Kitt Peak	Spacewatch	·	2.5 km	MPC · JPL
716432	2016 CP_{131}	—	August 9, 2013	Kitt Peak	Spacewatch	·	2.2 km	MPC · JPL
716433	2016 CN_{134}	—	December 11, 2014	Mount Lemmon	Mount Lemmon Survey	·	2.5 km	MPC · JPL
716434	2016 CU_{134}	—	September 26, 2003	Apache Point	SDSS Collaboration	·	1.3 km	MPC · JPL
716435	2016 CL_{135}	—	February 5, 2016	Haleakala	Pan-STARRS 1	V	470 m	MPC · JPL
716436	2016 CP_{137}	—	December 8, 2015	Haleakala	Pan-STARRS 1	H	360 m	MPC · JPL
716437	2016 CC_{140}	—	August 30, 2014	Haleakala	Pan-STARRS 1	·	1.9 km	MPC · JPL
716438	2016 CM_{140}	—	May 15, 2013	Haleakala	Pan-STARRS 1	·	810 m	MPC · JPL
716439	2016 CR_{141}	—	July 13, 2013	Haleakala	Pan-STARRS 1	·	2.8 km	MPC · JPL
716440	2016 CB_{143}	—	February 7, 2016	Mount Lemmon	Mount Lemmon Survey	·	2.2 km	MPC · JPL
716441	2016 CV_{144}	—	March 20, 2007	Kitt Peak	Spacewatch	·	660 m	MPC · JPL
716442	2016 CE_{145}	—	March 5, 2006	Kitt Peak	Spacewatch	·	1.5 km	MPC · JPL
716443	2016 CZ_{145}	—	January 16, 2005	Mauna Kea	Veillet, C.	HYG	2.2 km	MPC · JPL
716444	2016 CV_{146}	—	January 17, 2016	Haleakala	Pan-STARRS 1	EOS	1.5 km	MPC · JPL
716445	2016 CC_{147}	—	November 7, 2008	Kitt Peak	Spacewatch	·	2.8 km	MPC · JPL
716446	2016 CC_{148}	—	February 1, 2016	Haleakala	Pan-STARRS 1	·	2.4 km	MPC · JPL
716447	2016 CN_{149}	—	November 22, 2014	Haleakala	Pan-STARRS 1	·	2.1 km	MPC · JPL
716448	2016 CF_{150}	—	January 17, 2015	Haleakala	Pan-STARRS 1	·	2.7 km	MPC · JPL
716449	2016 CC_{151}	—	February 13, 2011	Mount Lemmon	Mount Lemmon Survey	·	2.2 km	MPC · JPL
716450	2016 CG_{151}	—	August 25, 2014	Haleakala	Pan-STARRS 1	·	2.6 km	MPC · JPL
716451	2016 CH_{151}	—	August 30, 2014	Haleakala	Pan-STARRS 1	TEL	1.3 km	MPC · JPL
716452	2016 CY_{151}	—	July 15, 2013	Haleakala	Pan-STARRS 1	·	2.5 km	MPC · JPL
716453	2016 CZ_{152}	—	May 1, 2006	Mauna Kea	P. A. Wiegert	THM	1.8 km	MPC · JPL
716454	2016 CA_{153}	—	April 2, 2011	Haleakala	Pan-STARRS 1	VER	2.1 km	MPC · JPL
716455	2016 CB_{154}	—	August 15, 2013	Haleakala	Pan-STARRS 1	·	2.5 km	MPC · JPL
716456	2016 CH_{156}	—	January 2, 2016	Mount Lemmon	Mount Lemmon Survey	EOS	1.6 km	MPC · JPL
716457	2016 CP_{157}	—	January 10, 2006	Kitt Peak	Spacewatch	·	640 m	MPC · JPL
716458	2016 CE_{158}	—	November 13, 1999	Kitt Peak	Spacewatch	MAS	520 m	MPC · JPL
716459	2016 CK_{159}	—	August 31, 2013	Haleakala	Pan-STARRS 1	·	2.1 km	MPC · JPL
716460	2016 CO_{161}	—	February 25, 2011	Mount Lemmon	Mount Lemmon Survey	·	1.6 km	MPC · JPL
716461	2016 CE_{162}	—	August 15, 2013	Haleakala	Pan-STARRS 1	VER	2.3 km	MPC · JPL
716462	2016 CW_{164}	—	September 18, 2014	Haleakala	Pan-STARRS 1	EOS	1.7 km	MPC · JPL
716463	2016 CE_{166}	—	October 30, 2014	Haleakala	Pan-STARRS 1	·	2.7 km	MPC · JPL
716464	2016 CY_{167}	—	November 24, 2009	Kitt Peak	Spacewatch	·	2.0 km	MPC · JPL
716465	2016 CJ_{168}	—	October 10, 2008	Mount Lemmon	Mount Lemmon Survey	EOS	1.7 km	MPC · JPL
716466	2016 CV_{168}	—	January 7, 2016	Haleakala	Pan-STARRS 1	·	2.6 km	MPC · JPL
716467	2016 CK_{169}	—	September 1, 2013	Haleakala	Pan-STARRS 1	·	1.9 km	MPC · JPL
716468	2016 CL_{172}	—	October 28, 2008	Mount Lemmon	Mount Lemmon Survey	·	610 m	MPC · JPL
716469	2016 CO_{172}	—	October 2, 2014	Haleakala	Pan-STARRS 1	·	2.6 km	MPC · JPL
716470	2016 CQ_{172}	—	October 9, 2008	Kitt Peak	Spacewatch	·	2.8 km	MPC · JPL
716471	2016 CV_{172}	—	May 15, 2013	Haleakala	Pan-STARRS 1	·	2.0 km	MPC · JPL
716472	2016 CF_{173}	—	December 18, 2015	Mount Lemmon	Mount Lemmon Survey	·	870 m	MPC · JPL
716473	2016 CU_{173}	—	March 16, 2012	Kitt Peak	Spacewatch	·	1.6 km	MPC · JPL
716474	2016 CF_{175}	—	December 8, 2015	Haleakala	Pan-STARRS 1	H	290 m	MPC · JPL
716475	2016 CG_{175}	—	November 21, 2014	Haleakala	Pan-STARRS 1	·	2.8 km	MPC · JPL
716476	2016 CL_{175}	—	December 13, 2015	Haleakala	Pan-STARRS 1	EOS	1.5 km	MPC · JPL
716477	2016 CF_{178}	—	June 15, 2013	Mount Lemmon	Mount Lemmon Survey	·	3.1 km	MPC · JPL
716478	2016 CU_{178}	—	February 11, 2011	Mount Lemmon	Mount Lemmon Survey	EOS	1.2 km	MPC · JPL
716479	2016 CR_{179}	—	April 21, 2013	Haleakala	Pan-STARRS 1	·	3.1 km	MPC · JPL
716480	2016 CR_{180}	—	May 21, 2012	Mount Lemmon	Mount Lemmon Survey	·	2.4 km	MPC · JPL
716481	2016 CB_{181}	—	October 26, 2014	Mount Lemmon	Mount Lemmon Survey	·	2.5 km	MPC · JPL
716482	2016 CS_{181}	—	July 16, 2013	Haleakala	Pan-STARRS 1	·	3.2 km	MPC · JPL
716483	2016 CW_{183}	—	April 7, 2006	Kitt Peak	Spacewatch	V	470 m	MPC · JPL
716484	2016 CA_{184}	—	February 5, 2011	Haleakala	Pan-STARRS 1	·	1.4 km	MPC · JPL
716485	2016 CP_{184}	—	October 28, 2014	Mount Lemmon	Mount Lemmon Survey	·	2.3 km	MPC · JPL
716486	2016 CS_{184}	—	March 27, 2012	Mount Lemmon	Mount Lemmon Survey	·	2.9 km	MPC · JPL
716487	2016 CZ_{184}	—	January 4, 2016	Haleakala	Pan-STARRS 1	·	2.2 km	MPC · JPL
716488	2016 CA_{185}	—	February 9, 2016	Haleakala	Pan-STARRS 1	VER	2.3 km	MPC · JPL
716489	2016 CB_{185}	—	September 4, 2008	Kitt Peak	Spacewatch	VER	2.1 km	MPC · JPL
716490	2016 CW_{185}	—	August 31, 2014	Haleakala	Pan-STARRS 1	·	2.4 km	MPC · JPL
716491	2016 CD_{188}	—	January 30, 2011	Haleakala	Pan-STARRS 1	EOS	1.1 km	MPC · JPL
716492	2016 CC_{190}	—	January 19, 2005	Kitt Peak	Spacewatch	·	3.0 km	MPC · JPL
716493	2016 CO_{190}	—	August 12, 2013	Kitt Peak	Spacewatch	EOS	1.6 km	MPC · JPL
716494	2016 CT_{191}	—	October 3, 2014	Mount Lemmon	Mount Lemmon Survey	·	2.4 km	MPC · JPL
716495	2016 CJ_{192}	—	January 16, 2011	Mount Lemmon	Mount Lemmon Survey	·	2.1 km	MPC · JPL
716496	2016 CK_{192}	—	March 3, 2009	Mount Lemmon	Mount Lemmon Survey	·	790 m	MPC · JPL
716497	2016 CS_{192}	—	January 7, 2016	Haleakala	Pan-STARRS 1	·	590 m	MPC · JPL
716498	2016 CW_{192}	—	January 6, 2006	Mount Lemmon	Mount Lemmon Survey	·	700 m	MPC · JPL
716499	2016 CL_{198}	—	February 22, 2009	Mount Lemmon	Mount Lemmon Survey	·	550 m	MPC · JPL
716500	2016 CX_{199}	—	October 2, 2013	Mount Lemmon	Mount Lemmon Survey	THM	1.9 km	MPC · JPL

== 716501–716600 ==
back to top

Designation			Discovery			Properties		Ref
Permanent	Provisional	Named after	Date	Site	Discoverer(s)	Category	Diam.	Ref
716501	2016 CQ_{200}	—	February 1, 2005	Kitt Peak	Spacewatch	·	2.7 km	MPC · JPL
716502	2016 CV_{200}	—	January 29, 2011	Kitt Peak	Spacewatch	·	1.4 km	MPC · JPL
716503	2016 CN_{201}	—	December 5, 2005	Kitt Peak	Spacewatch	·	560 m	MPC · JPL
716504	2016 CO_{201}	—	March 10, 2005	Mount Lemmon	Mount Lemmon Survey	MAS	630 m	MPC · JPL
716505	2016 CQ_{201}	—	October 22, 2008	Kitt Peak	Spacewatch	·	580 m	MPC · JPL
716506	2016 CH_{202}	—	February 8, 2011	Mount Lemmon	Mount Lemmon Survey	KOR	1.1 km	MPC · JPL
716507	2016 CA_{204}	—	August 12, 2013	Haleakala	Pan-STARRS 1	VER	2.1 km	MPC · JPL
716508	2016 CV_{204}	—	November 20, 2014	Haleakala	Pan-STARRS 1	EOS	1.4 km	MPC · JPL
716509	2016 CG_{206}	—	January 17, 2009	Kitt Peak	Spacewatch	·	590 m	MPC · JPL
716510	2016 CL_{207}	—	September 13, 2007	Mount Lemmon	Mount Lemmon Survey	·	1.0 km	MPC · JPL
716511	2016 CY_{207}	—	September 4, 2014	Haleakala	Pan-STARRS 1	·	2.3 km	MPC · JPL
716512	2016 CP_{208}	—	August 27, 2014	Haleakala	Pan-STARRS 1	V	540 m	MPC · JPL
716513	2016 CD_{214}	—	March 3, 2009	Mount Lemmon	Mount Lemmon Survey	·	650 m	MPC · JPL
716514	2016 CW_{214}	—	February 9, 2016	Haleakala	Pan-STARRS 1	THM	2.2 km	MPC · JPL
716515	2016 CO_{216}	—	November 26, 2014	Mount Lemmon	Mount Lemmon Survey	TRE	2.1 km	MPC · JPL
716516	2016 CX_{216}	—	November 26, 2014	Haleakala	Pan-STARRS 1	·	1.5 km	MPC · JPL
716517	2016 CF_{217}	—	January 9, 2016	Haleakala	Pan-STARRS 1	·	1.6 km	MPC · JPL
716518	2016 CA_{218}	—	April 5, 2011	Mount Lemmon	Mount Lemmon Survey	·	1.9 km	MPC · JPL
716519	2016 CB_{219}	—	February 9, 2016	Haleakala	Pan-STARRS 1	·	800 m	MPC · JPL
716520	2016 CO_{220}	—	December 12, 2014	Haleakala	Pan-STARRS 1	·	2.7 km	MPC · JPL
716521	2016 CY_{222}	—	January 10, 2016	Haleakala	Pan-STARRS 1	·	2.9 km	MPC · JPL
716522	2016 CF_{223}	—	October 9, 2007	Mount Lemmon	Mount Lemmon Survey	·	740 m	MPC · JPL
716523	2016 CT_{224}	—	April 10, 2000	Kitt Peak	M. W. Buie	EOS	2.0 km	MPC · JPL
716524	2016 CT_{225}	—	December 18, 2009	Kitt Peak	Spacewatch	URS	3.1 km	MPC · JPL
716525	2016 CC_{226}	—	October 21, 2008	Mount Lemmon	Mount Lemmon Survey	·	2.5 km	MPC · JPL
716526	2016 CD_{226}	—	November 17, 2014	Haleakala	Pan-STARRS 1	·	2.3 km	MPC · JPL
716527	2016 CJ_{226}	—	September 23, 2008	Mount Lemmon	Mount Lemmon Survey	·	2.5 km	MPC · JPL
716528	2016 CN_{228}	—	October 29, 2014	Haleakala	Pan-STARRS 1	·	1.5 km	MPC · JPL
716529	2016 CY_{228}	—	October 27, 2008	Kitt Peak	Spacewatch	·	2.7 km	MPC · JPL
716530	2016 CF_{230}	—	February 10, 2016	Haleakala	Pan-STARRS 1	T_{j} (2.96)	3.5 km	MPC · JPL
716531	2016 CQ_{231}	—	October 6, 2008	Mount Lemmon	Mount Lemmon Survey	·	2.8 km	MPC · JPL
716532	2016 CZ_{231}	—	April 14, 2011	Mount Lemmon	Mount Lemmon Survey	·	3.0 km	MPC · JPL
716533	2016 CM_{232}	—	October 28, 2011	Mount Lemmon	Mount Lemmon Survey	·	700 m	MPC · JPL
716534	2016 CG_{234}	—	October 8, 2008	Kitt Peak	Spacewatch	·	2.1 km	MPC · JPL
716535	2016 CW_{234}	—	November 22, 2014	Haleakala	Pan-STARRS 1	·	2.5 km	MPC · JPL
716536	2016 CR_{236}	—	June 11, 2007	Mauna Kea	D. D. Balam, K. M. Perrett	·	2.5 km	MPC · JPL
716537	2016 CC_{238}	—	September 14, 2013	Haleakala	Pan-STARRS 1	·	2.4 km	MPC · JPL
716538	2016 CS_{240}	—	April 13, 2011	Haleakala	Pan-STARRS 1	·	2.6 km	MPC · JPL
716539	2016 CV_{242}	—	November 17, 2014	Haleakala	Pan-STARRS 1	·	2.8 km	MPC · JPL
716540	2016 CR_{245}	—	October 23, 2014	Kitt Peak	Spacewatch	·	1.4 km	MPC · JPL
716541	2016 CQ_{249}	—	February 4, 2009	Kitt Peak	Spacewatch	V	550 m	MPC · JPL
716542	2016 CE_{253}	—	February 12, 2011	Mount Lemmon	Mount Lemmon Survey	·	2.5 km	MPC · JPL
716543	2016 CX_{254}	—	August 15, 2013	Haleakala	Pan-STARRS 1	·	2.3 km	MPC · JPL
716544	2016 CF_{255}	—	November 16, 2014	Haleakala	Pan-STARRS 1	TIR	2.7 km	MPC · JPL
716545	2016 CQ_{256}	—	January 15, 2016	Haleakala	Pan-STARRS 1	·	440 m	MPC · JPL
716546	2016 CQ_{263}	—	March 11, 2005	Mount Lemmon	Mount Lemmon Survey	·	2.7 km	MPC · JPL
716547	2016 CD_{273}	—	February 8, 2016	Mount Lemmon	Mount Lemmon Survey	TIR	2.8 km	MPC · JPL
716548	2016 CK_{278}	—	September 4, 2010	Mount Lemmon	Mount Lemmon Survey	·	910 m	MPC · JPL
716549	2016 CN_{278}	—	February 5, 2016	Haleakala	Pan-STARRS 1	·	840 m	MPC · JPL
716550	2016 CX_{278}	—	September 3, 2013	Kitt Peak	Spacewatch	·	2.6 km	MPC · JPL
716551	2016 CZ_{278}	—	March 10, 2005	Mount Lemmon	Mount Lemmon Survey	·	830 m	MPC · JPL
716552	2016 CM_{280}	—	December 16, 2014	Haleakala	Pan-STARRS 1	·	2.4 km	MPC · JPL
716553	2016 CQ_{281}	—	February 9, 2016	Haleakala	Pan-STARRS 1	·	1.2 km	MPC · JPL
716554	2016 CP_{282}	—	February 4, 2016	Haleakala	Pan-STARRS 1	·	2.3 km	MPC · JPL
716555	2016 CG_{283}	—	September 19, 2014	Haleakala	Pan-STARRS 1	·	620 m	MPC · JPL
716556	2016 CT_{283}	—	September 14, 2007	Mount Lemmon	Mount Lemmon Survey	·	2.6 km	MPC · JPL
716557	2016 CO_{286}	—	December 10, 2014	Mount Lemmon	Mount Lemmon Survey	·	2.5 km	MPC · JPL
716558	2016 CT_{286}	—	February 4, 2016	Haleakala	Pan-STARRS 1	HYG	2.6 km	MPC · JPL
716559	2016 CM_{287}	—	February 5, 2016	Haleakala	Pan-STARRS 1	VER	2.1 km	MPC · JPL
716560	2016 CX_{287}	—	January 6, 2010	Kitt Peak	Spacewatch	EOS	1.9 km	MPC · JPL
716561	2016 CD_{290}	—	November 17, 2014	Haleakala	Pan-STARRS 1	·	970 m	MPC · JPL
716562	2016 CT_{290}	—	August 29, 2009	Kitt Peak	Spacewatch	·	1.6 km	MPC · JPL
716563	2016 CE_{292}	—	February 11, 2016	Haleakala	Pan-STARRS 1	NYS	870 m	MPC · JPL
716564	2016 CR_{293}	—	September 15, 2010	Mount Lemmon	Mount Lemmon Survey	·	1.0 km	MPC · JPL
716565	2016 CY_{293}	—	December 29, 2011	Mount Lemmon	Mount Lemmon Survey	V	520 m	MPC · JPL
716566	2016 CQ_{294}	—	February 12, 2016	Haleakala	Pan-STARRS 1	EOS	1.8 km	MPC · JPL
716567	2016 CX_{294}	—	September 5, 2008	Kitt Peak	Spacewatch	EOS	1.6 km	MPC · JPL
716568	2016 CK_{298}	—	February 4, 2016	Haleakala	Pan-STARRS 1	·	920 m	MPC · JPL
716569	2016 CQ_{298}	—	July 14, 2013	Haleakala	Pan-STARRS 1	·	1.8 km	MPC · JPL
716570	2016 CY_{298}	—	February 4, 2016	Haleakala	Pan-STARRS 1	·	3.2 km	MPC · JPL
716571	2016 CA_{299}	—	March 2, 2011	Kitt Peak	Spacewatch	·	2.2 km	MPC · JPL
716572	2016 CL_{299}	—	October 9, 2008	Kitt Peak	Spacewatch	·	2.7 km	MPC · JPL
716573	2016 CW_{299}	—	October 6, 2008	Kitt Peak	Spacewatch	·	2.0 km	MPC · JPL
716574	2016 CE_{308}	—	May 1, 2011	Haleakala	Pan-STARRS 1	·	2.9 km	MPC · JPL
716575	2016 CM_{309}	—	January 6, 2010	Kitt Peak	Spacewatch	EOS	1.7 km	MPC · JPL
716576	2016 CN_{310}	—	April 15, 2013	Haleakala	Pan-STARRS 1	·	530 m	MPC · JPL
716577	2016 CW_{310}	—	February 9, 2016	Haleakala	Pan-STARRS 1	EOS	1.3 km	MPC · JPL
716578	2016 CG_{312}	—	September 13, 2013	Kitt Peak	Spacewatch	·	2.9 km	MPC · JPL
716579	2016 CT_{313}	—	February 10, 2016	Haleakala	Pan-STARRS 1	·	2.5 km	MPC · JPL
716580	2016 CN_{315}	—	November 1, 2008	Mount Lemmon	Mount Lemmon Survey	·	2.4 km	MPC · JPL
716581	2016 CO_{315}	—	September 3, 2013	Haleakala	Pan-STARRS 1	·	2.1 km	MPC · JPL
716582	2016 CV_{317}	—	February 11, 2004	Palomar	NEAT	·	3.0 km	MPC · JPL
716583	2016 CC_{318}	—	February 11, 2016	Haleakala	Pan-STARRS 1	·	1.9 km	MPC · JPL
716584	2016 CB_{337}	—	February 5, 2016	Haleakala	Pan-STARRS 1	·	2.2 km	MPC · JPL
716585	2016 CE_{337}	—	February 9, 2016	Haleakala	Pan-STARRS 1	·	1.4 km	MPC · JPL
716586	2016 CS_{339}	—	February 5, 2016	Haleakala	Pan-STARRS 1	·	1.5 km	MPC · JPL
716587	2016 CG_{340}	—	February 5, 2016	Haleakala	Pan-STARRS 1	·	2.5 km	MPC · JPL
716588	2016 CX_{340}	—	February 5, 2016	Mount Lemmon	Mount Lemmon Survey	·	2.8 km	MPC · JPL
716589	2016 CH_{345}	—	February 9, 2016	Mount Lemmon	Mount Lemmon Survey	(1338) (FLO)	450 m	MPC · JPL
716590	2016 CO_{345}	—	February 11, 2016	Haleakala	Pan-STARRS 1	·	1.2 km	MPC · JPL
716591	2016 CL_{346}	—	February 10, 2016	Haleakala	Pan-STARRS 1	NYS	720 m	MPC · JPL
716592	2016 CE_{347}	—	February 5, 2016	Haleakala	Pan-STARRS 1	·	780 m	MPC · JPL
716593	2016 CH_{351}	—	February 11, 2016	Haleakala	Pan-STARRS 1	·	670 m	MPC · JPL
716594	2016 CE_{358}	—	February 10, 2016	Haleakala	Pan-STARRS 1	·	2.5 km	MPC · JPL
716595	2016 CJ_{374}	—	February 10, 2016	Haleakala	Pan-STARRS 1	·	1.4 km	MPC · JPL
716596	2016 CF_{386}	—	May 22, 2011	Mount Lemmon	Mount Lemmon Survey	VER	2.3 km	MPC · JPL
716597	2016 CP_{387}	—	February 4, 2016	Haleakala	Pan-STARRS 1	·	2.7 km	MPC · JPL
716598	2016 CS_{387}	—	September 1, 2013	Mount Lemmon	Mount Lemmon Survey	·	1.9 km	MPC · JPL
716599	2016 CW_{390}	—	February 10, 2016	Haleakala	Pan-STARRS 1	·	1 km	MPC · JPL
716600	2016 CS_{405}	—	February 8, 2016	Mount Lemmon	Mount Lemmon Survey	·	690 m	MPC · JPL

== 716601–716700 ==
back to top

Designation			Discovery			Properties		Ref
Permanent	Provisional	Named after	Date	Site	Discoverer(s)	Category	Diam.	Ref
716601	2016 CF_{409}	—	February 10, 2016	Haleakala	Pan-STARRS 1	·	2.4 km	MPC · JPL
716602	2016 CE_{412}	—	February 10, 2016	Haleakala	Pan-STARRS 1	EOS	1.4 km	MPC · JPL
716603	2016 CH_{416}	—	November 2, 2010	Mount Lemmon	Mount Lemmon Survey	·	1.0 km	MPC · JPL
716604	2016 DW_{3}	—	February 24, 2006	Kitt Peak	Spacewatch	·	540 m	MPC · JPL
716605	2016 DF_{5}	—	September 20, 2003	Palomar	NEAT	·	3.0 km	MPC · JPL
716606	2016 DF_{6}	—	January 20, 2016	Mount Lemmon	Mount Lemmon Survey	·	920 m	MPC · JPL
716607	2016 DR_{7}	—	September 4, 2007	Mount Lemmon	Mount Lemmon Survey	·	2.7 km	MPC · JPL
716608	2016 DO_{8}	—	September 10, 2007	Mount Lemmon	Mount Lemmon Survey	·	3.0 km	MPC · JPL
716609	2016 DE_{10}	—	December 9, 2015	Haleakala	Pan-STARRS 1	LUT	4.0 km	MPC · JPL
716610	2016 DC_{11}	—	March 1, 2005	Kitt Peak	Spacewatch	NYS	890 m	MPC · JPL
716611	2016 DU_{11}	—	February 9, 2005	Mount Lemmon	Mount Lemmon Survey	MAS	620 m	MPC · JPL
716612	2016 DV_{11}	—	March 9, 2005	Mount Lemmon	Mount Lemmon Survey	(31811)	2.6 km	MPC · JPL
716613	2016 DE_{12}	—	October 25, 2011	Haleakala	Pan-STARRS 1	·	510 m	MPC · JPL
716614	2016 DQ_{14}	—	August 8, 2012	Haleakala	Pan-STARRS 1	·	2.7 km	MPC · JPL
716615	2016 DD_{16}	—	March 4, 2005	Kitt Peak	Spacewatch	·	2.8 km	MPC · JPL
716616	2016 DT_{16}	—	November 17, 2011	Kitt Peak	Spacewatch	·	730 m	MPC · JPL
716617	2016 DV_{19}	—	April 1, 2011	Haleakala	Pan-STARRS 1	·	1.7 km	MPC · JPL
716618	2016 DN_{20}	—	February 4, 2009	Mount Lemmon	Mount Lemmon Survey	·	480 m	MPC · JPL
716619	2016 DM_{22}	—	June 18, 2013	Haleakala	Pan-STARRS 1	NYS	870 m	MPC · JPL
716620	2016 DO_{22}	—	May 20, 2006	Kitt Peak	Spacewatch	·	2.2 km	MPC · JPL
716621	2016 DW_{25}	—	August 12, 2013	Haleakala	Pan-STARRS 1	·	2.3 km	MPC · JPL
716622	2016 DB_{27}	—	February 16, 2010	Mount Lemmon	Mount Lemmon Survey	·	2.8 km	MPC · JPL
716623	2016 DY_{27}	—	December 11, 2009	Catalina	CSS	·	3.0 km	MPC · JPL
716624	2016 DJ_{28}	—	October 2, 2014	Haleakala	Pan-STARRS 1	URS	2.4 km	MPC · JPL
716625	2016 DX_{28}	—	January 15, 2010	Mount Lemmon	Mount Lemmon Survey	·	2.7 km	MPC · JPL
716626	2016 DG_{29}	—	February 9, 2016	Haleakala	Pan-STARRS 1	·	2.8 km	MPC · JPL
716627	2016 DS_{29}	—	October 9, 2007	Kitt Peak	Spacewatch	·	820 m	MPC · JPL
716628	2016 DH_{30}	—	October 27, 2011	Mount Lemmon	Mount Lemmon Survey	·	660 m	MPC · JPL
716629	2016 DS_{30}	—	October 23, 2008	Kitt Peak	Spacewatch	·	2.3 km	MPC · JPL
716630	2016 DS_{32}	—	February 19, 2009	Kitt Peak	Spacewatch	·	860 m	MPC · JPL
716631	2016 DQ_{33}	—	October 24, 2008	Kitt Peak	Spacewatch	·	2.6 km	MPC · JPL
716632	2016 DT_{34}	—	February 28, 2016	Mount Lemmon	Mount Lemmon Survey	·	3.2 km	MPC · JPL
716633	2016 DV_{35}	—	February 6, 2016	Haleakala	Pan-STARRS 1	·	750 m	MPC · JPL
716634	2016 DP_{38}	—	February 29, 2016	Cerro Paranal	Altmann, M., Prusti, T.	V	420 m	MPC · JPL
716635	2016 DB_{39}	—	February 27, 2016	Kitt Peak	Spacewatch	·	770 m	MPC · JPL
716636	2016 DZ_{42}	—	February 16, 2016	Mount Lemmon	Mount Lemmon Survey	·	1.0 km	MPC · JPL
716637	2016 ES_{2}	—	February 2, 2005	Kitt Peak	Spacewatch	NYS	900 m	MPC · JPL
716638	2016 ES_{6}	—	April 6, 2005	Mount Lemmon	Mount Lemmon Survey	NYS	870 m	MPC · JPL
716639	2016 EX_{6}	—	March 2, 2016	Mount Lemmon	Mount Lemmon Survey	·	820 m	MPC · JPL
716640	2016 ES_{8}	—	April 1, 2011	Mount Lemmon	Mount Lemmon Survey	·	2.6 km	MPC · JPL
716641	2016 EZ_{8}	—	January 12, 2010	Kitt Peak	Spacewatch	·	2.8 km	MPC · JPL
716642	2016 EH_{9}	—	January 7, 2005	Campo Imperatore	CINEOS	·	890 m	MPC · JPL
716643	2016 EL_{9}	—	September 14, 2013	Haleakala	Pan-STARRS 1	·	3.2 km	MPC · JPL
716644	2016 ET_{10}	—	January 9, 2016	Haleakala	Pan-STARRS 1	·	2.9 km	MPC · JPL
716645	2016 EL_{20}	—	September 14, 2007	Mauna Kea	P. A. Wiegert	·	3.1 km	MPC · JPL
716646	2016 EK_{23}	—	January 18, 2015	Mount Lemmon	Mount Lemmon Survey	EOS	1.7 km	MPC · JPL
716647	2016 EL_{28}	—	March 14, 2013	Palomar	Palomar Transient Factory	·	810 m	MPC · JPL
716648	2016 EW_{30}	—	January 13, 2005	Kitt Peak	Spacewatch	EOS	1.6 km	MPC · JPL
716649	2016 ER_{34}	—	November 17, 2014	Mount Lemmon	Mount Lemmon Survey	·	3.2 km	MPC · JPL
716650	2016 EU_{38}	—	June 4, 1995	Kitt Peak	Spacewatch	·	2.7 km	MPC · JPL
716651	2016 EC_{40}	—	September 20, 2008	Kitt Peak	Spacewatch	·	2.4 km	MPC · JPL
716652	2016 EG_{42}	—	October 8, 2008	Mount Lemmon	Mount Lemmon Survey	EOS	1.6 km	MPC · JPL
716653	2016 EJ_{42}	—	July 28, 2013	Haleakala	Pan-STARRS 1	·	2.8 km	MPC · JPL
716654	2016 EU_{44}	—	September 4, 2013	Črni Vrh	Skvarč, J.	TIR	3.3 km	MPC · JPL
716655	2016 EX_{44}	—	December 8, 2015	Haleakala	Pan-STARRS 1	·	2.3 km	MPC · JPL
716656	2016 EJ_{51}	—	March 4, 2016	Haleakala	Pan-STARRS 1	·	2.7 km	MPC · JPL
716657	2016 EY_{53}	—	May 9, 2002	Palomar	NEAT	·	890 m	MPC · JPL
716658	2016 EA_{54}	—	March 31, 2009	Kitt Peak	Spacewatch	·	850 m	MPC · JPL
716659	2016 EW_{57}	—	May 25, 2006	Mauna Kea	P. A. Wiegert	MAS	540 m	MPC · JPL
716660	2016 EY_{57}	—	August 18, 2002	Palomar	NEAT	·	2.7 km	MPC · JPL
716661	2016 EG_{61}	—	April 4, 2005	Mount Lemmon	Mount Lemmon Survey	·	900 m	MPC · JPL
716662	2016 EV_{62}	—	October 26, 2013	Mount Lemmon	Mount Lemmon Survey	·	3.0 km	MPC · JPL
716663	2016 EZ_{62}	—	November 26, 2014	Haleakala	Pan-STARRS 1	·	3.3 km	MPC · JPL
716664	2016 EH_{63}	—	August 8, 2012	Haleakala	Pan-STARRS 1	·	3.0 km	MPC · JPL
716665	2016 EM_{63}	—	November 21, 2009	Mount Lemmon	Mount Lemmon Survey	·	2.4 km	MPC · JPL
716666	2016 ED_{65}	—	December 20, 2004	Mount Lemmon	Mount Lemmon Survey	·	910 m	MPC · JPL
716667	2016 EM_{70}	—	July 6, 2013	Haleakala	Pan-STARRS 1	V	560 m	MPC · JPL
716668	2016 EA_{74}	—	March 2, 2005	Catalina	CSS	·	1.0 km	MPC · JPL
716669	2016 EQ_{75}	—	September 15, 2006	Kitt Peak	Spacewatch	·	3.5 km	MPC · JPL
716670	2016 EU_{76}	—	September 24, 2008	Mount Lemmon	Mount Lemmon Survey	·	2.1 km	MPC · JPL
716671	2016 ES_{78}	—	October 5, 2013	Haleakala	Pan-STARRS 1	·	2.7 km	MPC · JPL
716672	2016 ED_{80}	—	November 26, 2014	Haleakala	Pan-STARRS 1	·	3.0 km	MPC · JPL
716673	2016 EN_{80}	—	November 17, 2008	Kitt Peak	Spacewatch	VER	3.0 km	MPC · JPL
716674	2016 EF_{81}	—	November 2, 2008	Mount Lemmon	Mount Lemmon Survey	·	2.8 km	MPC · JPL
716675	2016 ES_{81}	—	December 29, 2008	Mount Lemmon	Mount Lemmon Survey	·	650 m	MPC · JPL
716676	2016 ES_{82}	—	February 4, 2016	Haleakala	Pan-STARRS 1	V	490 m	MPC · JPL
716677	2016 EX_{83}	—	March 26, 2011	Mount Lemmon	Mount Lemmon Survey	·	3.1 km	MPC · JPL
716678	2016 EE_{89}	—	September 4, 2007	Mount Lemmon	Mount Lemmon Survey	·	3.0 km	MPC · JPL
716679	2016 EL_{92}	—	March 26, 2011	Mount Lemmon	Mount Lemmon Survey	VER	2.5 km	MPC · JPL
716680	2016 EK_{93}	—	February 4, 2016	Haleakala	Pan-STARRS 1	·	2.9 km	MPC · JPL
716681	2016 EL_{94}	—	September 10, 2007	Mount Lemmon	Mount Lemmon Survey	·	3.6 km	MPC · JPL
716682	2016 EP_{100}	—	May 8, 2011	Mount Lemmon	Mount Lemmon Survey	·	2.9 km	MPC · JPL
716683	2016 EN_{101}	—	May 1, 2011	Haleakala	Pan-STARRS 1	·	3.1 km	MPC · JPL
716684	2016 EZ_{101}	—	September 29, 2008	Kitt Peak	Spacewatch	·	1.8 km	MPC · JPL
716685	2016 EA_{102}	—	April 21, 2006	Kitt Peak	Spacewatch	·	2.6 km	MPC · JPL
716686	2016 EG_{102}	—	September 24, 2008	Mount Lemmon	Mount Lemmon Survey	EOS	1.5 km	MPC · JPL
716687	2016 EP_{102}	—	March 7, 2016	Haleakala	Pan-STARRS 1	·	2.5 km	MPC · JPL
716688	2016 EA_{105}	—	March 4, 2016	Haleakala	Pan-STARRS 1	·	3.4 km	MPC · JPL
716689	2016 EE_{109}	—	February 4, 2016	Haleakala	Pan-STARRS 1	·	1.8 km	MPC · JPL
716690	2016 EM_{109}	—	September 7, 2008	Mount Lemmon	Mount Lemmon Survey	·	3.1 km	MPC · JPL
716691	2016 EP_{114}	—	January 20, 2009	Kitt Peak	Spacewatch	·	540 m	MPC · JPL
716692	2016 ED_{115}	—	March 10, 2016	Mount Lemmon	Mount Lemmon Survey	EUN	1.1 km	MPC · JPL
716693	2016 EY_{116}	—	October 28, 2014	Haleakala	Pan-STARRS 1	·	2.0 km	MPC · JPL
716694	2016 EM_{117}	—	November 27, 2014	Kitt Peak	Spacewatch	·	2.3 km	MPC · JPL
716695	2016 EK_{121}	—	September 1, 2013	Haleakala	Pan-STARRS 1	AGN	810 m	MPC · JPL
716696	2016 ET_{122}	—	February 15, 2016	Mount Lemmon	Mount Lemmon Survey	·	610 m	MPC · JPL
716697	2016 EF_{123}	—	November 21, 2014	Haleakala	Pan-STARRS 1	EOS	1.7 km	MPC · JPL
716698	2016 EW_{125}	—	September 1, 2013	Mount Lemmon	Mount Lemmon Survey	·	2.5 km	MPC · JPL
716699	2016 EV_{126}	—	September 10, 2013	Haleakala	Pan-STARRS 1	BRA	1.2 km	MPC · JPL
716700	2016 EW_{126}	—	February 28, 2009	Kitt Peak	Spacewatch	V	550 m	MPC · JPL

== 716701–716800 ==
back to top

Designation			Discovery			Properties		Ref
Permanent	Provisional	Named after	Date	Site	Discoverer(s)	Category	Diam.	Ref
716701	2016 EP_{127}	—	September 15, 2006	Kitt Peak	Spacewatch	MAS	650 m	MPC · JPL
716702	2016 ES_{129}	—	July 2, 2013	Haleakala	Pan-STARRS 1	·	730 m	MPC · JPL
716703	2016 EP_{131}	—	January 21, 2012	Kitt Peak	Spacewatch	NYS	830 m	MPC · JPL
716704	2016 EW_{136}	—	September 13, 2007	Mount Lemmon	Mount Lemmon Survey	·	640 m	MPC · JPL
716705	2016 EV_{138}	—	February 5, 2016	Haleakala	Pan-STARRS 1	PHO	720 m	MPC · JPL
716706	2016 EB_{140}	—	September 29, 2008	Kitt Peak	Spacewatch	·	2.8 km	MPC · JPL
716707	2016 ER_{140}	—	June 22, 2012	Kitt Peak	Spacewatch	·	2.5 km	MPC · JPL
716708	2016 EV_{145}	—	October 2, 2008	Kitt Peak	Spacewatch	·	2.2 km	MPC · JPL
716709	2016 EQ_{148}	—	March 10, 2016	Haleakala	Pan-STARRS 1	·	880 m	MPC · JPL
716710	2016 EO_{149}	—	October 22, 2006	Mount Lemmon	Mount Lemmon Survey	ERI	1.4 km	MPC · JPL
716711	2016 EA_{153}	—	September 4, 2014	Haleakala	Pan-STARRS 1	·	3.4 km	MPC · JPL
716712	2016 EY_{159}	—	June 20, 2006	Mount Lemmon	Mount Lemmon Survey	·	1.0 km	MPC · JPL
716713	2016 EV_{161}	—	March 11, 2016	Mount Lemmon	Mount Lemmon Survey	MAS	440 m	MPC · JPL
716714	2016 EE_{162}	—	September 10, 2007	Mount Lemmon	Mount Lemmon Survey	·	3.4 km	MPC · JPL
716715	2016 EM_{165}	—	October 8, 2007	Mount Lemmon	Mount Lemmon Survey	·	710 m	MPC · JPL
716716	2016 EW_{168}	—	October 1, 2008	Mount Lemmon	Mount Lemmon Survey	·	2.7 km	MPC · JPL
716717	2016 EO_{170}	—	March 16, 2009	Kitt Peak	Spacewatch	NYS	720 m	MPC · JPL
716718	2016 EY_{172}	—	November 17, 2014	Haleakala	Pan-STARRS 1	·	2.3 km	MPC · JPL
716719	2016 EX_{174}	—	February 10, 2016	Haleakala	Pan-STARRS 1	·	3.0 km	MPC · JPL
716720	2016 EH_{175}	—	January 12, 2010	Kitt Peak	Spacewatch	·	3.6 km	MPC · JPL
716721	2016 EW_{175}	—	March 10, 2005	Mount Lemmon	Mount Lemmon Survey	·	990 m	MPC · JPL
716722	2016 EE_{177}	—	October 10, 2008	Mount Lemmon	Mount Lemmon Survey	·	2.2 km	MPC · JPL
716723	2016 EJ_{178}	—	September 16, 2004	Kitt Peak	Spacewatch	·	710 m	MPC · JPL
716724	2016 EU_{184}	—	February 27, 2012	Haleakala	Pan-STARRS 1	HNS	810 m	MPC · JPL
716725	2016 EC_{188}	—	August 26, 2013	Haleakala	Pan-STARRS 1	·	3.2 km	MPC · JPL
716726	2016 EZ_{188}	—	November 30, 2003	Kitt Peak	Spacewatch	EOS	1.7 km	MPC · JPL
716727	2016 EN_{189}	—	November 2, 2008	Mount Lemmon	Mount Lemmon Survey	·	2.5 km	MPC · JPL
716728	2016 EA_{191}	—	December 10, 2014	Mount Lemmon	Mount Lemmon Survey	EOS	1.9 km	MPC · JPL
716729	2016 ED_{191}	—	November 27, 2014	Haleakala	Pan-STARRS 1	EOS	1.5 km	MPC · JPL
716730	2016 EG_{191}	—	February 10, 2016	Haleakala	Pan-STARRS 1	·	2.6 km	MPC · JPL
716731	2016 EZ_{191}	—	November 3, 2008	Mount Lemmon	Mount Lemmon Survey	·	2.9 km	MPC · JPL
716732	2016 EO_{198}	—	September 13, 2013	Kitt Peak	Spacewatch	·	2.6 km	MPC · JPL
716733	2016 EW_{199}	—	February 11, 2016	Haleakala	Pan-STARRS 1	·	960 m	MPC · JPL
716734	2016 EC_{201}	—	November 3, 2008	Mount Lemmon	Mount Lemmon Survey	·	3.0 km	MPC · JPL
716735	2016 EL_{203}	—	September 7, 2004	Kitt Peak	Spacewatch	AGN	990 m	MPC · JPL
716736	2016 ER_{204}	—	October 16, 2009	Mount Lemmon	Mount Lemmon Survey	L4	6.8 km	MPC · JPL
716737	2016 EQ_{207}	—	April 10, 2005	Kitt Peak	Deep Ecliptic Survey	·	2.4 km	MPC · JPL
716738	2016 EV_{207}	—	October 11, 2013	Catalina	CSS	TIR	3.0 km	MPC · JPL
716739	2016 EP_{216}	—	December 20, 2009	Kitt Peak	Spacewatch	·	1.4 km	MPC · JPL
716740	2016 EN_{222}	—	February 11, 2008	Mount Lemmon	Mount Lemmon Survey	V	620 m	MPC · JPL
716741	2016 EK_{226}	—	October 16, 2012	Mount Lemmon	Mount Lemmon Survey	·	2.9 km	MPC · JPL
716742	2016 EU_{227}	—	September 26, 2008	Kitt Peak	Spacewatch	·	2.3 km	MPC · JPL
716743	2016 EZ_{227}	—	November 9, 2008	Mount Lemmon	Mount Lemmon Survey	EOS	2.0 km	MPC · JPL
716744	2016 EY_{229}	—	October 23, 2003	Apache Point	SDSS Collaboration	·	2.1 km	MPC · JPL
716745	2016 EU_{230}	—	June 21, 2007	Kitt Peak	Spacewatch	EOS	2.0 km	MPC · JPL
716746	2016 EZ_{232}	—	April 12, 2011	Mount Lemmon	Mount Lemmon Survey	·	1.4 km	MPC · JPL
716747	2016 EK_{233}	—	March 12, 2005	Kitt Peak	Spacewatch	·	2.1 km	MPC · JPL
716748	2016 EM_{233}	—	March 30, 2011	Haleakala	Pan-STARRS 1	·	1.5 km	MPC · JPL
716749	2016 EC_{234}	—	November 22, 2014	Mount Lemmon	Mount Lemmon Survey	·	1.0 km	MPC · JPL
716750	2016 EM_{235}	—	November 11, 2010	Mount Lemmon	Mount Lemmon Survey	·	1.1 km	MPC · JPL
716751	2016 ER_{235}	—	March 4, 2016	Haleakala	Pan-STARRS 1	·	1.6 km	MPC · JPL
716752	2016 EB_{236}	—	October 29, 2008	Kitt Peak	Spacewatch	EOS	1.6 km	MPC · JPL
716753	2016 ET_{236}	—	March 5, 2016	Haleakala	Pan-STARRS 1	·	1.1 km	MPC · JPL
716754	2016 EA_{237}	—	November 26, 2014	Haleakala	Pan-STARRS 1	·	2.6 km	MPC · JPL
716755	2016 EB_{237}	—	April 12, 2011	Catalina	CSS	TIR	2.6 km	MPC · JPL
716756	2016 EM_{244}	—	March 2, 2016	Mount Lemmon	Mount Lemmon Survey	EOS	1.5 km	MPC · JPL
716757	2016 EB_{247}	—	October 13, 2014	Mount Lemmon	Mount Lemmon Survey	·	870 m	MPC · JPL
716758	2016 ED_{247}	—	September 15, 2007	Kitt Peak	Spacewatch	(43176)	2.5 km	MPC · JPL
716759	2016 EZ_{248}	—	March 15, 2016	Haleakala	Pan-STARRS 1	·	1.2 km	MPC · JPL
716760	2016 EM_{249}	—	March 4, 2016	Haleakala	Pan-STARRS 1	·	870 m	MPC · JPL
716761	2016 EP_{257}	—	October 16, 2002	Palomar	NEAT	LIX	3.5 km	MPC · JPL
716762	2016 EU_{257}	—	March 13, 2016	Haleakala	Pan-STARRS 1	LUT	3.6 km	MPC · JPL
716763	2016 EC_{263}	—	February 4, 2016	Haleakala	Pan-STARRS 1	·	2.6 km	MPC · JPL
716764	2016 EW_{264}	—	March 4, 2016	Haleakala	Pan-STARRS 1	·	510 m	MPC · JPL
716765	2016 EO_{265}	—	March 10, 2016	Haleakala	Pan-STARRS 1	·	860 m	MPC · JPL
716766	2016 EE_{266}	—	March 7, 2016	Haleakala	Pan-STARRS 1	PHO	760 m	MPC · JPL
716767	2016 EV_{272}	—	March 15, 2016	Mount Lemmon	Mount Lemmon Survey	·	760 m	MPC · JPL
716768	2016 EU_{274}	—	July 13, 2013	Mount Lemmon	Mount Lemmon Survey	·	1.3 km	MPC · JPL
716769	2016 EV_{292}	—	March 14, 2016	Mount Lemmon	Mount Lemmon Survey	·	2.3 km	MPC · JPL
716770	2016 EM_{300}	—	March 14, 2016	Mount Lemmon	Mount Lemmon Survey	PAD	1.3 km	MPC · JPL
716771	2016 EX_{301}	—	March 7, 2016	Haleakala	Pan-STARRS 1	·	3.0 km	MPC · JPL
716772	2016 EJ_{304}	—	March 12, 2016	Mount Lemmon	Mount Lemmon Survey	·	880 m	MPC · JPL
716773	2016 EW_{304}	—	March 10, 2016	Haleakala	Pan-STARRS 1	·	1.2 km	MPC · JPL
716774	2016 ED_{306}	—	March 13, 2016	Haleakala	Pan-STARRS 1	·	2.1 km	MPC · JPL
716775	2016 EQ_{309}	—	March 15, 2016	Mount Lemmon	Mount Lemmon Survey	EOS	1.3 km	MPC · JPL
716776	2016 EO_{315}	—	March 2, 2016	Mount Lemmon	Mount Lemmon Survey	·	760 m	MPC · JPL
716777	2016 EK_{316}	—	March 16, 2012	Mount Lemmon	Mount Lemmon Survey	·	910 m	MPC · JPL
716778	2016 EL_{316}	—	March 1, 2016	Mount Lemmon	Mount Lemmon Survey	·	2.4 km	MPC · JPL
716779	2016 EG_{319}	—	March 12, 2016	Haleakala	Pan-STARRS 1	V	450 m	MPC · JPL
716780	2016 EJ_{319}	—	March 12, 2016	Haleakala	Pan-STARRS 1	·	680 m	MPC · JPL
716781	2016 EW_{357}	—	March 4, 2016	Haleakala	Pan-STARRS 1	·	1.1 km	MPC · JPL
716782	2016 FD_{4}	—	April 9, 2003	Kitt Peak	Spacewatch	·	720 m	MPC · JPL
716783	2016 FS_{4}	—	November 20, 2014	Mount Lemmon	Mount Lemmon Survey	·	1.1 km	MPC · JPL
716784	2016 FR_{8}	—	August 9, 2013	Haleakala	Pan-STARRS 1	NYS	1.0 km	MPC · JPL
716785	2016 FV_{10}	—	February 4, 2016	Haleakala	Pan-STARRS 1	·	3.1 km	MPC · JPL
716786	2016 FN_{11}	—	April 12, 2005	Kitt Peak	Spacewatch	NYS	920 m	MPC · JPL
716787	2016 FS_{23}	—	September 12, 2007	Mount Lemmon	Mount Lemmon Survey	·	670 m	MPC · JPL
716788	2016 FA_{24}	—	March 31, 2016	Mount Lemmon	Mount Lemmon Survey	·	790 m	MPC · JPL
716789	2016 FE_{26}	—	September 19, 2014	Haleakala	Pan-STARRS 1	·	570 m	MPC · JPL
716790	2016 FS_{26}	—	September 11, 2007	Mount Lemmon	Mount Lemmon Survey	·	2.4 km	MPC · JPL
716791	2016 FN_{27}	—	September 3, 2010	Mount Lemmon	Mount Lemmon Survey	·	840 m	MPC · JPL
716792	2016 FA_{29}	—	January 19, 2015	Haleakala	Pan-STARRS 1	·	2.6 km	MPC · JPL
716793	2016 FM_{29}	—	March 31, 2016	Mount Lemmon	Mount Lemmon Survey	HOF	1.8 km	MPC · JPL
716794	2016 FO_{29}	—	August 10, 2012	Kitt Peak	Spacewatch	·	2.6 km	MPC · JPL
716795	2016 FT_{30}	—	January 30, 2008	Mount Lemmon	Mount Lemmon Survey	NYS	850 m	MPC · JPL
716796	2016 FJ_{38}	—	August 12, 2006	Palomar	NEAT	·	680 m	MPC · JPL
716797	2016 FF_{40}	—	September 19, 2003	Kitt Peak	Spacewatch	TEL	1.1 km	MPC · JPL
716798	2016 FZ_{40}	—	March 2, 2009	Mount Lemmon	Mount Lemmon Survey	·	830 m	MPC · JPL
716799	2016 FE_{45}	—	November 6, 2008	Mount Lemmon	Mount Lemmon Survey	·	3.3 km	MPC · JPL
716800	2016 FJ_{45}	—	August 29, 2006	Kitt Peak	Spacewatch	·	980 m	MPC · JPL

== 716801–716900 ==
back to top

Designation			Discovery			Properties		Ref
Permanent	Provisional	Named after	Date	Site	Discoverer(s)	Category	Diam.	Ref
716801	2016 FD_{47}	—	March 12, 2016	Haleakala	Pan-STARRS 1	V	470 m	MPC · JPL
716802	2016 FV_{47}	—	September 12, 2007	Mount Lemmon	Mount Lemmon Survey	EOS	1.7 km	MPC · JPL
716803	2016 FG_{48}	—	September 13, 2007	Kitt Peak	Spacewatch	·	2.7 km	MPC · JPL
716804	2016 FC_{50}	—	November 8, 2009	Mount Lemmon	Mount Lemmon Survey	·	1.3 km	MPC · JPL
716805	2016 FD_{50}	—	February 15, 2012	Haleakala	Pan-STARRS 1	V	410 m	MPC · JPL
716806	2016 FL_{51}	—	October 11, 2007	Kitt Peak	Spacewatch	·	570 m	MPC · JPL
716807	2016 FP_{52}	—	November 9, 2013	Mount Lemmon	Mount Lemmon Survey	·	2.6 km	MPC · JPL
716808	2016 FE_{54}	—	November 17, 2014	Mount Lemmon	Mount Lemmon Survey	·	1.2 km	MPC · JPL
716809	2016 FF_{55}	—	May 8, 2005	Mount Lemmon	Mount Lemmon Survey	NYS	960 m	MPC · JPL
716810	2016 FY_{55}	—	April 16, 2005	Kitt Peak	Spacewatch	·	900 m	MPC · JPL
716811	2016 FU_{56}	—	October 6, 2013	Kitt Peak	Spacewatch	EOS	1.6 km	MPC · JPL
716812	2016 FS_{57}	—	October 28, 2014	Haleakala	Pan-STARRS 1	·	670 m	MPC · JPL
716813	2016 FZ_{57}	—	April 5, 2003	Cerro Tololo	Deep Lens Survey	·	3.2 km	MPC · JPL
716814	2016 FM_{63}	—	December 2, 2010	Mount Lemmon	Mount Lemmon Survey	PHO	860 m	MPC · JPL
716815	2016 FO_{65}	—	March 16, 2016	Haleakala	Pan-STARRS 1	EUN	840 m	MPC · JPL
716816	2016 FA_{71}	—	March 18, 2016	Mount Lemmon	Mount Lemmon Survey	·	860 m	MPC · JPL
716817	2016 FZ_{71}	—	March 27, 2016	Mount Lemmon	Mount Lemmon Survey	·	830 m	MPC · JPL
716818	2016 FP_{73}	—	March 30, 2016	Haleakala	Pan-STARRS 1	L4	6.9 km	MPC · JPL
716819	2016 FQ_{73}	—	January 22, 2015	Haleakala	Pan-STARRS 1	EOS	1.6 km	MPC · JPL
716820	2016 FR_{74}	—	March 17, 2016	Haleakala	Pan-STARRS 1	·	580 m	MPC · JPL
716821	2016 FD_{81}	—	March 17, 2016	Mount Lemmon	Mount Lemmon Survey	(5)	970 m	MPC · JPL
716822	2016 FV_{82}	—	January 18, 2009	Kitt Peak	Spacewatch	·	2.7 km	MPC · JPL
716823	2016 FA_{86}	—	March 28, 2016	Cerro Tololo	DECam	EMA	2.1 km	MPC · JPL
716824	2016 GP_{1}	—	February 15, 2016	Haleakala	Pan-STARRS 1	PHO	680 m	MPC · JPL
716825	2016 GU_{5}	—	September 28, 2008	Mount Lemmon	Mount Lemmon Survey	·	2.7 km	MPC · JPL
716826	2016 GF_{7}	—	September 14, 2007	Mount Lemmon	Mount Lemmon Survey	·	2.6 km	MPC · JPL
716827	2016 GY_{7}	—	February 10, 2016	Haleakala	Pan-STARRS 1	·	750 m	MPC · JPL
716828	2016 GN_{8}	—	October 9, 2007	Mount Lemmon	Mount Lemmon Survey	VER	2.2 km	MPC · JPL
716829	2016 GR_{8}	—	January 13, 2015	Haleakala	Pan-STARRS 1	KOR	1.1 km	MPC · JPL
716830	2016 GZ_{11}	—	May 13, 2005	Kitt Peak	Spacewatch	·	990 m	MPC · JPL
716831	2016 GD_{14}	—	March 11, 2005	Mount Lemmon	Mount Lemmon Survey	·	2.0 km	MPC · JPL
716832	2016 GP_{15}	—	March 10, 2005	Kitt Peak	Spacewatch	·	2.2 km	MPC · JPL
716833	2016 GT_{16}	—	September 2, 2013	Mount Lemmon	Mount Lemmon Survey	·	1.5 km	MPC · JPL
716834	2016 GP_{17}	—	February 10, 2008	Mount Lemmon	Mount Lemmon Survey	·	700 m	MPC · JPL
716835	2016 GQ_{17}	—	April 10, 2005	Kitt Peak	Spacewatch	·	2.9 km	MPC · JPL
716836	2016 GH_{18}	—	March 8, 2005	Mount Lemmon	Mount Lemmon Survey	·	800 m	MPC · JPL
716837	2016 GN_{24}	—	May 21, 2011	Mount Lemmon	Mount Lemmon Survey	·	3.2 km	MPC · JPL
716838	2016 GH_{25}	—	October 24, 2013	Mount Lemmon	Mount Lemmon Survey	·	2.5 km	MPC · JPL
716839	2016 GO_{25}	—	May 15, 2012	Mount Lemmon	Mount Lemmon Survey	·	1.2 km	MPC · JPL
716840	2016 GQ_{26}	—	December 21, 2014	Haleakala	Pan-STARRS 1	EOS	1.3 km	MPC · JPL
716841	2016 GW_{28}	—	March 13, 2016	Haleakala	Pan-STARRS 1	·	880 m	MPC · JPL
716842	2016 GH_{29}	—	April 15, 2012	Haleakala	Pan-STARRS 1	·	1.1 km	MPC · JPL
716843	2016 GP_{29}	—	April 11, 2005	Mount Lemmon	Mount Lemmon Survey	·	2.0 km	MPC · JPL
716844	2016 GD_{33}	—	January 11, 2008	Kitt Peak	Spacewatch	NYS	840 m	MPC · JPL
716845	2016 GK_{34}	—	December 1, 2014	Haleakala	Pan-STARRS 1	·	700 m	MPC · JPL
716846	2016 GX_{39}	—	October 17, 2012	Haleakala	Pan-STARRS 1	3:2	3.9 km	MPC · JPL
716847	2016 GC_{40}	—	March 16, 2007	Mount Lemmon	Mount Lemmon Survey	·	1.3 km	MPC · JPL
716848	2016 GK_{41}	—	December 18, 2014	Haleakala	Pan-STARRS 1	·	1.0 km	MPC · JPL
716849	2016 GV_{46}	—	March 10, 2016	Haleakala	Pan-STARRS 1	·	680 m	MPC · JPL
716850	2016 GA_{48}	—	November 20, 2003	Kitt Peak	Spacewatch	·	900 m	MPC · JPL
716851	2016 GP_{48}	—	September 10, 2013	Haleakala	Pan-STARRS 1	MAR	880 m	MPC · JPL
716852	2016 GU_{53}	—	May 1, 2011	Haleakala	Pan-STARRS 1	URS	3.1 km	MPC · JPL
716853	2016 GA_{54}	—	February 27, 2009	Kitt Peak	Spacewatch	(2076)	660 m	MPC · JPL
716854	2016 GX_{57}	—	October 14, 2010	Mount Lemmon	Mount Lemmon Survey	V	470 m	MPC · JPL
716855	2016 GP_{61}	—	March 13, 2016	Haleakala	Pan-STARRS 1	·	1.2 km	MPC · JPL
716856	2016 GQ_{63}	—	August 24, 2000	Socorro	LINEAR	·	570 m	MPC · JPL
716857	2016 GB_{65}	—	February 26, 2012	Haleakala	Pan-STARRS 1	NYS	900 m	MPC · JPL
716858	2016 GJ_{65}	—	April 4, 2008	Kitt Peak	Spacewatch	·	780 m	MPC · JPL
716859	2016 GM_{66}	—	October 3, 2013	Haleakala	Pan-STARRS 1	·	2.2 km	MPC · JPL
716860	2016 GA_{71}	—	December 3, 2014	Haleakala	Pan-STARRS 1	·	710 m	MPC · JPL
716861	2016 GD_{71}	—	November 10, 2013	Mount Lemmon	Mount Lemmon Survey	·	2.1 km	MPC · JPL
716862	2016 GT_{71}	—	June 6, 2003	Kitt Peak	Spacewatch	·	560 m	MPC · JPL
716863	2016 GV_{74}	—	October 7, 2013	Mount Lemmon	Mount Lemmon Survey	·	2.3 km	MPC · JPL
716864	2016 GP_{75}	—	October 10, 2007	Mount Lemmon	Mount Lemmon Survey	·	2.5 km	MPC · JPL
716865	2016 GV_{75}	—	October 2, 2013	Mount Lemmon	Mount Lemmon Survey	·	1.3 km	MPC · JPL
716866	2016 GY_{75}	—	March 18, 2016	Mount Lemmon	Mount Lemmon Survey	·	750 m	MPC · JPL
716867	2016 GA_{79}	—	September 6, 2013	Kitt Peak	Spacewatch	·	1.7 km	MPC · JPL
716868	2016 GZ_{84}	—	February 23, 2012	Mount Lemmon	Mount Lemmon Survey	·	790 m	MPC · JPL
716869	2016 GZ_{85}	—	September 3, 2013	Kitt Peak	Spacewatch	NEM	1.7 km	MPC · JPL
716870	2016 GV_{87}	—	November 26, 2014	Haleakala	Pan-STARRS 1	·	680 m	MPC · JPL
716871	2016 GM_{88}	—	April 1, 2016	Haleakala	Pan-STARRS 1	·	780 m	MPC · JPL
716872	2016 GA_{90}	—	November 3, 2004	Palomar	NEAT	·	680 m	MPC · JPL
716873	2016 GB_{92}	—	July 15, 2013	Haleakala	Pan-STARRS 1	·	910 m	MPC · JPL
716874	2016 GG_{96}	—	April 1, 2016	Haleakala	Pan-STARRS 1	AGN	940 m	MPC · JPL
716875	2016 GW_{99}	—	September 1, 2013	Mount Lemmon	Mount Lemmon Survey	·	1.1 km	MPC · JPL
716876	2016 GU_{102}	—	April 1, 2016	Haleakala	Pan-STARRS 1	·	920 m	MPC · JPL
716877	2016 GW_{109}	—	June 23, 2009	Mount Lemmon	Mount Lemmon Survey	·	1.1 km	MPC · JPL
716878	2016 GY_{110}	—	November 3, 2005	Kitt Peak	Spacewatch	·	1.1 km	MPC · JPL
716879	2016 GA_{112}	—	December 29, 2014	Haleakala	Pan-STARRS 1	·	2.3 km	MPC · JPL
716880	2016 GD_{115}	—	July 21, 2006	Mount Lemmon	Mount Lemmon Survey	NYS	810 m	MPC · JPL
716881	2016 GX_{115}	—	April 1, 2016	Haleakala	Pan-STARRS 1	·	690 m	MPC · JPL
716882	2016 GF_{117}	—	April 1, 2016	Mount Lemmon	Mount Lemmon Survey	·	860 m	MPC · JPL
716883	2016 GT_{121}	—	October 23, 2003	Apache Point	SDSS	·	710 m	MPC · JPL
716884	2016 GQ_{122}	—	October 12, 2005	Kitt Peak	Spacewatch	·	990 m	MPC · JPL
716885	2016 GN_{124}	—	April 9, 2002	Palomar	NEAT	·	2.0 km	MPC · JPL
716886	2016 GS_{124}	—	November 13, 2010	Mount Lemmon	Mount Lemmon Survey	·	1.3 km	MPC · JPL
716887	2016 GT_{124}	—	March 12, 2016	Haleakala	Pan-STARRS 1	·	570 m	MPC · JPL
716888	2016 GA_{125}	—	November 11, 2007	Mount Lemmon	Mount Lemmon Survey	·	850 m	MPC · JPL
716889	2016 GH_{125}	—	March 12, 2016	Haleakala	Pan-STARRS 1	·	870 m	MPC · JPL
716890	2016 GS_{125}	—	January 21, 2012	Kitt Peak	Spacewatch	·	970 m	MPC · JPL
716891	2016 GA_{130}	—	January 28, 2004	Kitt Peak	Spacewatch	VER	3.1 km	MPC · JPL
716892	2016 GM_{133}	—	June 18, 2013	Haleakala	Pan-STARRS 1	·	1.1 km	MPC · JPL
716893	2016 GQ_{133}	—	August 19, 2009	Hibiscus	Teamo, N.	MAS	610 m	MPC · JPL
716894	2016 GY_{141}	—	January 12, 2016	Haleakala	Pan-STARRS 1	PHO	960 m	MPC · JPL
716895	2016 GU_{143}	—	November 27, 2011	Kitt Peak	Spacewatch	·	630 m	MPC · JPL
716896	2016 GZ_{143}	—	April 6, 2011	Mount Lemmon	Mount Lemmon Survey	EOS	1.6 km	MPC · JPL
716897	2016 GH_{144}	—	January 2, 2011	Mount Lemmon	Mount Lemmon Survey	·	1.2 km	MPC · JPL
716898	2016 GN_{144}	—	February 28, 2012	Haleakala	Pan-STARRS 1	·	990 m	MPC · JPL
716899	2016 GS_{145}	—	March 2, 2009	Kitt Peak	Spacewatch	·	630 m	MPC · JPL
716900	2016 GV_{145}	—	July 15, 2013	Haleakala	Pan-STARRS 1	V	510 m	MPC · JPL

== 716901–717000 ==
back to top

Designation			Discovery			Properties		Ref
Permanent	Provisional	Named after	Date	Site	Discoverer(s)	Category	Diam.	Ref
716901	2016 GW_{152}	—	October 28, 2010	Mount Lemmon	Mount Lemmon Survey	·	990 m	MPC · JPL
716902	2016 GW_{153}	—	November 30, 2008	Mount Lemmon	Mount Lemmon Survey	·	2.4 km	MPC · JPL
716903	2016 GE_{154}	—	December 18, 2004	Mount Lemmon	Mount Lemmon Survey	·	900 m	MPC · JPL
716904	2016 GE_{156}	—	February 3, 2016	Haleakala	Pan-STARRS 1	·	2.6 km	MPC · JPL
716905	2016 GQ_{157}	—	March 29, 2011	Kitt Peak	Spacewatch	·	2.7 km	MPC · JPL
716906	2016 GW_{157}	—	November 5, 2007	Kitt Peak	Spacewatch	·	3.2 km	MPC · JPL
716907	2016 GG_{159}	—	March 14, 2016	Mount Lemmon	Mount Lemmon Survey	·	540 m	MPC · JPL
716908	2016 GP_{159}	—	December 22, 2008	Kitt Peak	Spacewatch	·	2.8 km	MPC · JPL
716909	2016 GX_{163}	—	April 17, 2009	Kitt Peak	Spacewatch	V	560 m	MPC · JPL
716910	2016 GG_{164}	—	July 1, 2013	Haleakala	Pan-STARRS 1	·	890 m	MPC · JPL
716911	2016 GK_{164}	—	April 3, 2016	Haleakala	Pan-STARRS 1	·	850 m	MPC · JPL
716912	2016 GG_{168}	—	March 15, 2016	Mount Lemmon	Mount Lemmon Survey	·	1.1 km	MPC · JPL
716913	2016 GK_{169}	—	November 23, 2014	Haleakala	Pan-STARRS 1	·	810 m	MPC · JPL
716914	2016 GO_{169}	—	April 13, 2013	Mount Lemmon	Mount Lemmon Survey	·	740 m	MPC · JPL
716915	2016 GV_{169}	—	September 9, 2007	Kitt Peak	Spacewatch	·	2.5 km	MPC · JPL
716916	2016 GT_{171}	—	June 4, 2013	Haleakala	Pan-STARRS 1	·	650 m	MPC · JPL
716917	2016 GK_{176}	—	April 14, 2007	Kitt Peak	Spacewatch	AGN	990 m	MPC · JPL
716918	2016 GM_{187}	—	February 11, 2016	Haleakala	Pan-STARRS 1	·	1.5 km	MPC · JPL
716919	2016 GR_{187}	—	October 5, 2013	Kitt Peak	Spacewatch	·	2.1 km	MPC · JPL
716920	2016 GQ_{196}	—	June 19, 2013	Mount Lemmon	Mount Lemmon Survey	·	920 m	MPC · JPL
716921	2016 GP_{202}	—	October 28, 2013	Mount Lemmon	Mount Lemmon Survey	·	2.6 km	MPC · JPL
716922	2016 GY_{205}	—	April 22, 2009	Mount Lemmon	Mount Lemmon Survey	·	870 m	MPC · JPL
716923	2016 GB_{208}	—	April 26, 2011	Mount Lemmon	Mount Lemmon Survey	EOS	1.5 km	MPC · JPL
716924	2016 GO_{210}	—	January 30, 2012	Mount Lemmon	Mount Lemmon Survey	·	960 m	MPC · JPL
716925	2016 GJ_{223}	—	January 18, 2012	Kitt Peak	Spacewatch	·	660 m	MPC · JPL
716926	2016 GP_{223}	—	October 14, 2006	Piszkéstető	K. Sárneczky, Kuli, Z.	·	1.1 km	MPC · JPL
716927	2016 GB_{224}	—	April 27, 2012	Haleakala	Pan-STARRS 1	·	840 m	MPC · JPL
716928	2016 GR_{227}	—	April 13, 2016	Mount Lemmon	Mount Lemmon Survey	·	790 m	MPC · JPL
716929	2016 GU_{228}	—	March 10, 2005	Mount Lemmon	Mount Lemmon Survey	·	890 m	MPC · JPL
716930	2016 GL_{231}	—	April 5, 2016	Haleakala	Pan-STARRS 1	·	990 m	MPC · JPL
716931	2016 GQ_{231}	—	December 31, 2011	Kitt Peak	Spacewatch	·	640 m	MPC · JPL
716932	2016 GZ_{231}	—	August 14, 2013	Haleakala	Pan-STARRS 1	V	510 m	MPC · JPL
716933	2016 GD_{232}	—	September 14, 2013	Haleakala	Pan-STARRS 1	·	1.1 km	MPC · JPL
716934	2016 GM_{233}	—	April 4, 2016	Haleakala	Pan-STARRS 1	·	880 m	MPC · JPL
716935	2016 GT_{235}	—	August 16, 2006	Palomar	NEAT	·	720 m	MPC · JPL
716936	2016 GY_{238}	—	April 2, 2005	Kitt Peak	Spacewatch	·	800 m	MPC · JPL
716937	2016 GQ_{240}	—	July 14, 2013	Haleakala	Pan-STARRS 1	PHO	950 m	MPC · JPL
716938	2016 GA_{241}	—	November 25, 2009	Catalina	CSS	H	510 m	MPC · JPL
716939	2016 GA_{243}	—	April 6, 2005	Kitt Peak	Spacewatch	·	2.7 km	MPC · JPL
716940	2016 GK_{246}	—	April 3, 2016	Haleakala	Pan-STARRS 1	·	940 m	MPC · JPL
716941	2016 GY_{248}	—	May 11, 2005	Mount Lemmon	Mount Lemmon Survey	MAS	580 m	MPC · JPL
716942	2016 GL_{252}	—	September 18, 2014	Haleakala	Pan-STARRS 1	H	340 m	MPC · JPL
716943	2016 GA_{253}	—	April 1, 2016	Haleakala	Pan-STARRS 1	H	370 m	MPC · JPL
716944	2016 GX_{262}	—	November 12, 2010	Mount Lemmon	Mount Lemmon Survey	PHO	690 m	MPC · JPL
716945	2016 GR_{264}	—	April 5, 2016	Haleakala	Pan-STARRS 1	·	760 m	MPC · JPL
716946	2016 GH_{265}	—	April 27, 2011	Haleakala	Pan-STARRS 1	TIR	3.0 km	MPC · JPL
716947	2016 GX_{268}	—	April 1, 2016	Haleakala	Pan-STARRS 1	THB	2.6 km	MPC · JPL
716948	2016 GR_{277}	—	April 2, 2016	Haleakala	Pan-STARRS 1	·	2.6 km	MPC · JPL
716949	2016 GL_{288}	—	April 1, 2016	Mount Lemmon	Mount Lemmon Survey	·	1.2 km	MPC · JPL
716950	2016 GA_{303}	—	April 4, 2016	Mount Lemmon	Mount Lemmon Survey	·	1.5 km	MPC · JPL
716951	2016 GG_{307}	—	April 5, 2016	Haleakala	Pan-STARRS 1	·	970 m	MPC · JPL
716952	2016 GZ_{308}	—	April 10, 2016	Haleakala	Pan-STARRS 1	·	3.1 km	MPC · JPL
716953	2016 GA_{312}	—	April 2, 2016	Haleakala	Pan-STARRS 1	·	660 m	MPC · JPL
716954	2016 GH_{317}	—	March 14, 2011	Mount Lemmon	Mount Lemmon Survey	AGN	890 m	MPC · JPL
716955	2016 GX_{337}	—	April 2, 2016	Haleakala	Pan-STARRS 1	·	2.3 km	MPC · JPL
716956	2016 GK_{340}	—	November 8, 2008	Mount Lemmon	Mount Lemmon Survey	·	2.1 km	MPC · JPL
716957	2016 GE_{345}	—	April 2, 2016	Haleakala	Pan-STARRS 1	·	720 m	MPC · JPL
716958	2016 GJ_{348}	—	January 16, 2015	Haleakala	Pan-STARRS 1	·	2.1 km	MPC · JPL
716959	2016 HW_{3}	—	September 15, 2013	Mount Lemmon	Mount Lemmon Survey	PHO	2.8 km	MPC · JPL
716960	2016 HA_{4}	—	May 13, 2005	Mount Lemmon	Mount Lemmon Survey	·	900 m	MPC · JPL
716961	2016 HW_{11}	—	March 21, 2012	Mount Lemmon	Mount Lemmon Survey	·	1.0 km	MPC · JPL
716962	2016 HZ_{18}	—	September 23, 2008	Kitt Peak	Spacewatch	·	1.8 km	MPC · JPL
716963	2016 HP_{45}	—	September 29, 2008	Mount Lemmon	Mount Lemmon Survey	·	1.3 km	MPC · JPL
716964	2016 JW_{15}	—	March 16, 2012	Mount Lemmon	Mount Lemmon Survey	·	690 m	MPC · JPL
716965	2016 JK_{16}	—	March 4, 2016	Haleakala	Pan-STARRS 1	·	1.1 km	MPC · JPL
716966	2016 JT_{22}	—	May 10, 2003	Kitt Peak	Spacewatch	·	490 m	MPC · JPL
716967	2016 JN_{23}	—	December 30, 2007	Kitt Peak	Spacewatch	NYS	1.1 km	MPC · JPL
716968	2016 JB_{25}	—	May 3, 2016	Mount Lemmon	Mount Lemmon Survey	·	940 m	MPC · JPL
716969	2016 JC_{45}	—	May 2, 2016	Haleakala	Pan-STARRS 1	·	3.7 km	MPC · JPL
716970	2016 JN_{46}	—	May 7, 2016	Haleakala	Pan-STARRS 1	·	1.4 km	MPC · JPL
716971	2016 JD_{60}	—	January 15, 2015	Haleakala	Pan-STARRS 1	·	1.4 km	MPC · JPL
716972	2016 KN_{9}	—	December 27, 2011	Mount Lemmon	Mount Lemmon Survey	L4 · ERY	6.7 km	MPC · JPL
716973	2016 KC_{14}	—	May 30, 2016	Haleakala	Pan-STARRS 1	·	1.9 km	MPC · JPL
716974	2016 LK_{4}	—	May 13, 2016	Haleakala	Pan-STARRS 1	PHO	690 m	MPC · JPL
716975	2016 LR_{11}	—	June 9, 2016	Haleakala	Pan-STARRS 1	H	440 m	MPC · JPL
716976	2016 LC_{12}	—	August 18, 2006	Palomar	NEAT	·	640 m	MPC · JPL
716977	2016 LE_{13}	—	April 5, 2005	Anderson Mesa	LONEOS	·	2.4 km	MPC · JPL
716978	2016 LC_{26}	—	October 26, 2013	Mount Lemmon	Mount Lemmon Survey	·	930 m	MPC · JPL
716979	2016 LM_{30}	—	September 30, 2006	Catalina	CSS	·	960 m	MPC · JPL
716980	2016 LO_{32}	—	September 15, 2009	Kitt Peak	Spacewatch	V	540 m	MPC · JPL
716981	2016 LG_{35}	—	September 21, 2003	Kitt Peak	Spacewatch	·	660 m	MPC · JPL
716982	2016 LK_{35}	—	June 9, 2005	Kitt Peak	Spacewatch	·	1.1 km	MPC · JPL
716983	2016 LX_{36}	—	November 8, 2010	Mount Lemmon	Mount Lemmon Survey	·	660 m	MPC · JPL
716984	2016 LD_{38}	—	November 27, 2013	Haleakala	Pan-STARRS 1	·	1.5 km	MPC · JPL
716985	2016 LJ_{42}	—	August 6, 2012	Haleakala	Pan-STARRS 1	·	920 m	MPC · JPL
716986	2016 LG_{45}	—	March 3, 2005	Kitt Peak	Spacewatch	·	730 m	MPC · JPL
716987	2016 LJ_{46}	—	May 5, 2016	Haleakala	Pan-STARRS 1	·	1.1 km	MPC · JPL
716988	2016 LN_{46}	—	December 28, 2013	Mount Lemmon	Mount Lemmon Survey	EUN	950 m	MPC · JPL
716989	2016 LS_{46}	—	March 11, 2002	Palomar	NEAT	·	1.8 km	MPC · JPL
716990	2016 LH_{47}	—	April 21, 2009	Mount Lemmon	Mount Lemmon Survey	·	620 m	MPC · JPL
716991	2016 LK_{48}	—	June 11, 2016	Mauna Kea	Ramanjooloo, Y., D. J. Tholen	·	2.4 km	MPC · JPL
716992	2016 LL_{52}	—	November 20, 2014	Mount Lemmon	Mount Lemmon Survey	H	460 m	MPC · JPL
716993	2016 LD_{56}	—	January 27, 2015	Haleakala	Pan-STARRS 1	BRG	1.4 km	MPC · JPL
716994	2016 LN_{56}	—	June 7, 2016	Haleakala	Pan-STARRS 1	EOS	1.6 km	MPC · JPL
716995	2016 LA_{57}	—	March 30, 2011	Mount Lemmon	Mount Lemmon Survey	·	1.0 km	MPC · JPL
716996	2016 LC_{57}	—	June 7, 2016	Haleakala	Pan-STARRS 1	·	1.2 km	MPC · JPL
716997	2016 LD_{58}	—	June 7, 2016	Haleakala	Pan-STARRS 1	·	1.2 km	MPC · JPL
716998	2016 LE_{58}	—	January 26, 2015	Haleakala	Pan-STARRS 1	EUN	1.4 km	MPC · JPL
716999	2016 LJ_{59}	—	October 18, 2003	Kitt Peak	Spacewatch	·	750 m	MPC · JPL
717000	2016 LW_{60}	—	August 6, 2005	Palomar	NEAT	·	2.1 km	MPC · JPL

back to top

== Meaning of names ==
As minor planet discoveries are confirmed, they are given a permanent number by the IAU's Minor Planet Center (MPC), and the discoverers can then submit names for them, following the IAU's naming conventions. The list below concerns those minor planets in the specified number-range that have received names, and explains the meanings of those names.

Official naming citations of newly named small Solar System bodies are approved and published in a bulletin by IAU's Working Group for Small Bodies Nomenclature (WGSBN). Before May 2021, citations were published in MPC's Minor Planet Circulars for many decades. Recent citations can also be found on the JPL Small-Body Database (SBDB). Until his death in 2016, German astronomer Lutz D. Schmadel compiled these citations into the Dictionary of Minor Planet Names (DMP) and regularly updated the collection.

Based on Paul Herget's The Names of the Minor Planets, Schmadel also researched the unclear origin of numerous asteroids, most of which had been named prior to World War II. This article incorporates text from this source, which is in the public domain: SBDB New namings may only be added to this list below after official publication as the preannouncement of names is condemned. The WGSBN publishes a comprehensive guideline for the naming rules of non-cometary small Solar System bodies.

Named minor planet	Provisional	This minor planet was named for...	Ref · Catalog
716260 Baybayan	2016 BK_{61}	Chad Kalepa Baybayan (1956–2021), master Hawaiian Pwo navigator.	IAU · 716260
