= John Magorrian =

John Magorrian is an astrophysicist in the Rudolf Peierls Centre for Theoretical Physics at the University of Oxford. His research relates to the modelling of the structure and evolution of galaxies. He is a member of the Nuker Team of the Hubble Space Telescope. Magorrian discovered a link between the size of black holes at the centre of galaxies and the size of its galaxy which has been named "The Magorrian Relationship".
