= Richard Green (astronomer) =

American astronomer

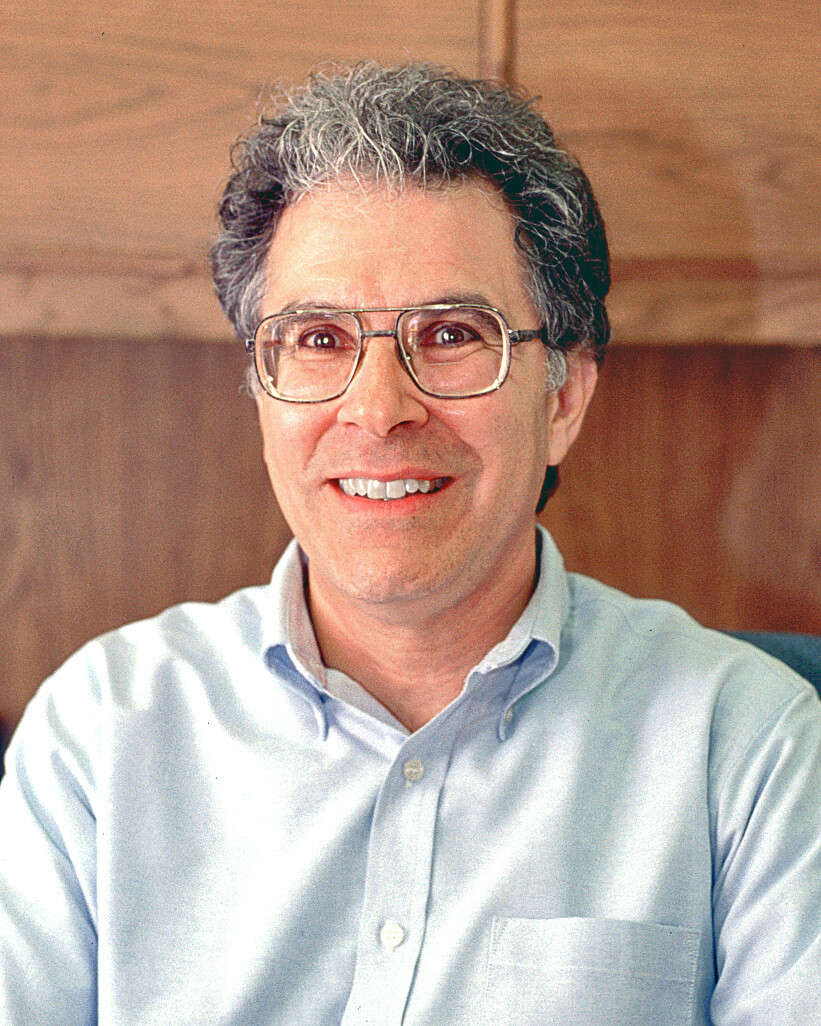
- Green in 2002
- Born: Richard Frederick Green
- Education: California Institute of Technology
- Scientific career
- Fields: Astrophysics, Astronomy (Extragalactic Astronomy and Cosmology)
- Workplaces: University of Arizona, Large Binocular Telescope
- Thesis: A Complete Sample of White Dwarfs, Hot Subdwarfs, and Quasars (1977)
- Doctoral advisor: Maarten Schmidt

Richard Frederick Green is an American astronomer, former director of the Kitt Peak National Observatory, United Kingdom Infrared Telescope and the Large Binocular Telescope Observatory.

== Career ==
He was awarded a bachelor's degree in astronomy by Harvard University in 1971 and a Ph.D. by California Institute of Technology in 1977.

He worked at the National Optical Astronomy Observatory (NOAO) for over 20 years, being promoted deputy director of NOAO in 1992.

He was appointed Director of the Kitt Peak National Observatory in 1997 after which he moved in 2005 to become Director of the Large Binocular Telescope at the Mount Graham International Observatory in southeast Arizona.

He was also an adjunct professor of astronomy at the University of Arizona where he was Director of the University of Arizona/United Kingdom Infrared Telescope Observatory. He was also a member of the Space Telescope Imaging Spectrograph instrument team for the Hubble Space Telescope, the Nuker Team and the NASA Far Ultraviolet Spectroscopic Explorer mission science team.

In 2017 he was appointed Division Director in the Division of Astronomical Sciences, National Science Foundation.

His main research interest is in the area of active galaxies and quasars. He was elected a Legacy Fellow of the American Astronomical Society in 2020.
