= Nuker Team =

Scientific group that studied black holes

The Nuker Team was formed to use the Hubble Space Telescope, with its high-resolution imaging and spectroscopy, to investigate the central structure and dynamics of galaxies. The team used the HST to examine supermassive black holes and determined the relationship between a galaxy's central black hole's mass and velocity dispersion. The team continues to conduct research and publish papers on the supermassive black holes of galaxies and clusters. The group was initially formed by Tod R. Lauer, then a first year postdoc. At the first meeting of the group held at Princeton University in June 1985, Sandra Faber was elected the group leader.

== Members ==
The original members of the Nuker Team include Alan Dressler (OCIW), Sandra Faber (UCO/Lick; First PI), John Kormendy (Texas), Tod R. Lauer (NOAO), Douglas Richstone (Michigan; Present PI), and Scott Tremaine (IAS). Later additions to the team include Ralf Bender (Munchen), Alexei V. Filippenko (Berkeley), Karl Gebhardt (Texas), Richard Green (LBTO), Kayhan Gultekin (Michigan), Luis C. Ho (OCIW), John Magorrian (Oxford), Jason Pinkney (Ohio Northern), and Christos Siopis (Michigan).

== Etymology ==
The name "Nuker" began as an informal internal reference by members of the team to each other, because they came together to study the nuclei of galaxies using the space telescope. The first use of the name was in a 1989 email from Faber, who addressed her five colleagues as "Dear Nukers". As the team began to publish its research, the name came into general use in the scientific community.

The name "Nuker" is also used in reference to the "Nuker Law", which is a description of the inner few (~3-10) arcseconds of predominantly nearby (< 30 Mpc) early-type galaxy light-profiles. The Nuker Law was described first by members of the Nuker Team, from which it gets its name.

== See also ==
- List of astronomical societies

== Sources ==
- Stern, S. Alan, Our Universe: The Thrill of Extragalactic Exploration As Told by Leading Experts, Cambridge University Press, 2001 ISBN 0-521-78330-5 and ISBN 0-521-78907-9
