= Tod R. Lauer =

American astronomer (born 1957)

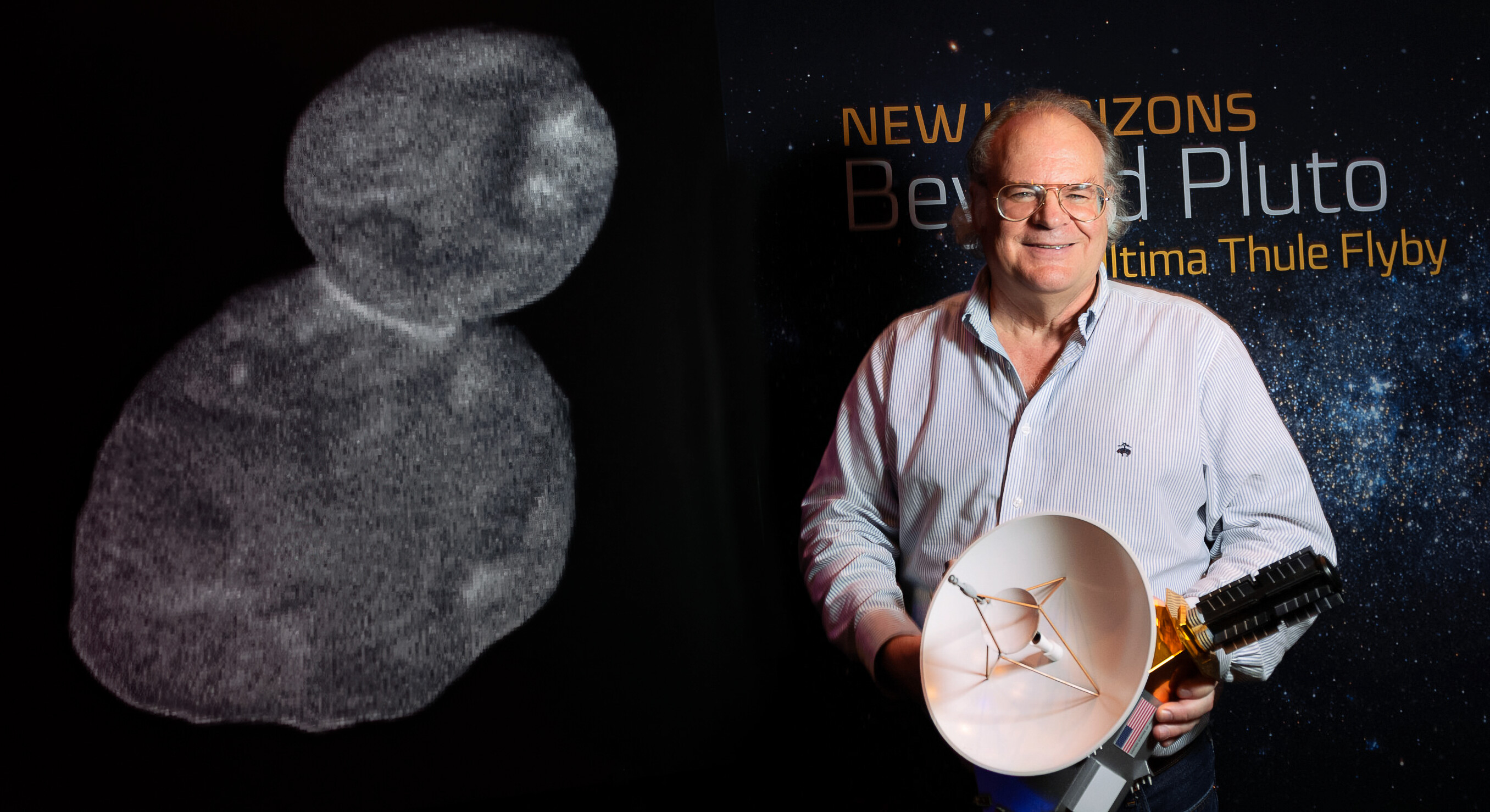
- Born: 1957 (age 68–69); Ohio, United States
- Education: Caltech; UC Santa Cruz
- Awards: NASA Medal for Exceptional Scientific Achievement (1992)
- Scientific career
- Fields: Astronomy
- Workplaces: NSF NOIRLab; Princeton University
- Thesis: High resolution surface photometry of elliptical galaxies (1983)
- Doctoral advisor: Sandra M. Faber

Tod Richard Lauer (born 1957) is an American astronomer on the research staff of the NSF NOIRLab.

== Early life and education ==
Lauer studied Astronomy at the California Institute of Technology and graduated with a BS degree in 1979. He received his PhD degree in Astronomy from the University of California, Santa Cruz in 1983 for High resolution surface photometry of elliptical galaxies.

== Career ==
Lauer was a member of the Hubble Space Telescope Wide Field and Planetary Camera team, and is a founding member of the Nuker Team. His research interests includes observational searches for massive black holes in the centers of galaxies, the structure of elliptical galaxies, stellar populations, large-scale structure of the universe, and astronomical image processing. He was the Principal Investigator of the Destiny JDEM concept study, one of the precursors to the Nancy Grace Roman Space Telescope mission. Asteroid 3135 Lauer is named for him. He appears in an episode of the documentary series Naked Science. He joined the New Horizons Pluto team in order to apply his extensive experience with deep space imaging to the New Horizons data, yielding significantly clearer and mathematically accurate images of Pluto and Charon.

== Awards and honors ==
An asteroid, (3135) Lauer, was named in his honor in 1981. In 1992, Lauer was awarded the NASA Exceptional Scientific Achievement Medal for his work with the Wide-Field and Planetary Camera aboard the Hubble Space Telescope. Lauer has been twice awarded the AURA Outstanding Achievement Award for Outstanding Science for 1993 and 2016 by the Association of Universities for Research in Astronomy. As a member of the New Horizons team, Lauer shared the 2017 NASA Group Achievement Award. As a member of the Event Horizon Telescope collaboration, Lauer shared the 2020 Breakthrough Prize in Fundamental Physics.
