= NGC 3801 =

Galaxy in the constellation Leo

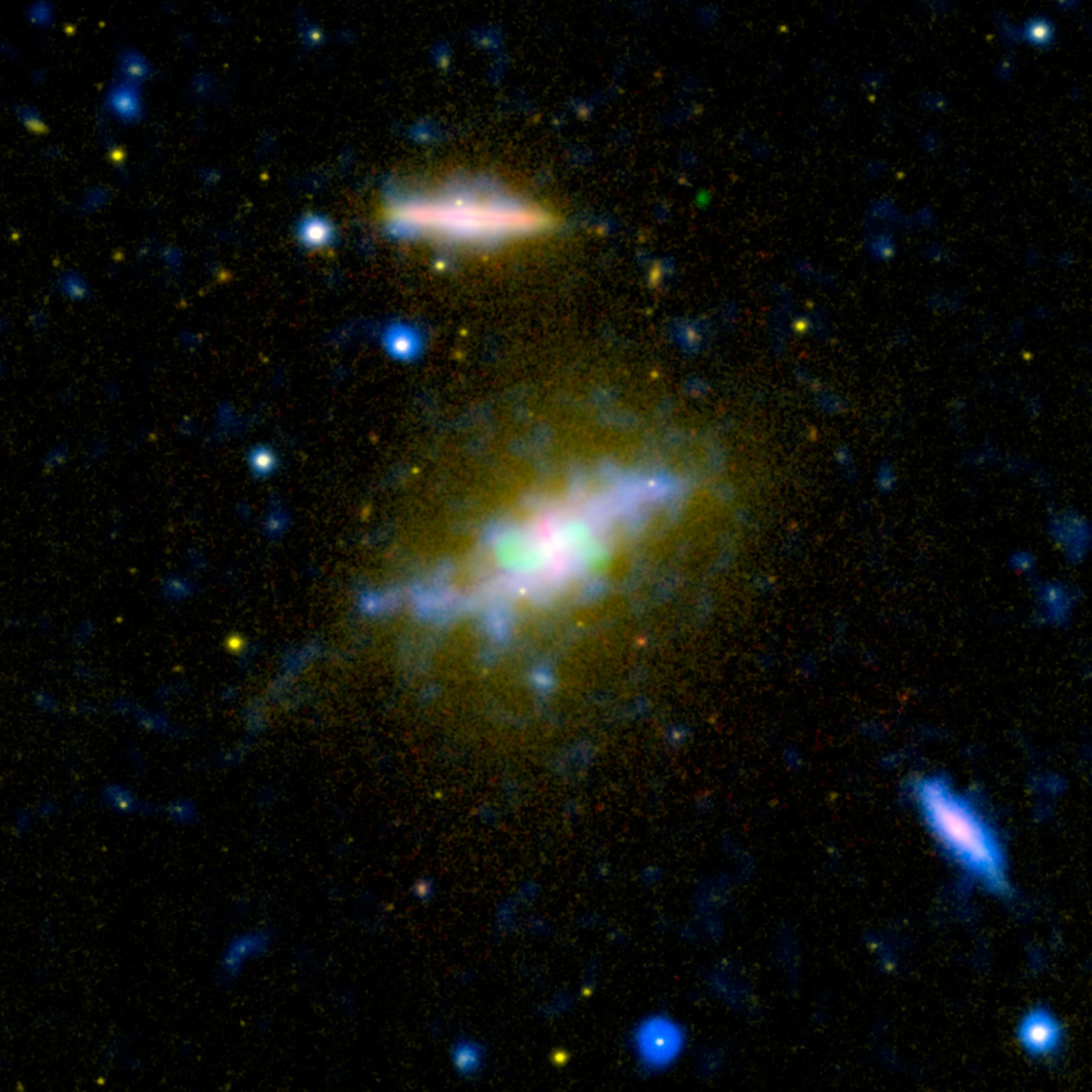
- Multiwavelength image of NGC 3801, from ultraviolet to radio

Observation data (J2000 epoch)
- Constellation: Leo
- Right ascension: 11^{h} 40^{m} 16.9^{s}
- Declination: +17° 43′ 41″
- Redshift: 0.011064 ± 0.000007
- Heliocentric radial velocity: 3,317 ± 2 km/s
- Distance: 169 ± 38 Mly (51.9 ± 11.6 Mpc)
- Apparent magnitude (V): 12.0

Characteristics
- Type: S0/a
- Apparent size (V): 3.5′ × 2.1′
- Notable features: merger remnant, radio galaxy

Other designations
- UGC 6635, MCG +03-30-040, 4C +17.52, PGC 36200

NGC 3801 is a lenticular galaxy located in the constellation Leo. It is about 150 million light years from Earth, and estimated to be about 170,000 light years in diameter. William Herschel discovered it on 17 April 1784.

== Characteristics ==
The morphology of NGC 3801 is disturbed, indicating that the galaxy underwent a merger with another gas rich galaxy. A dust lane runs across the galaxy in its eastern half while a smaller one is visible perpendicular to that along the minor axis. A tidal tail about 1.2 arcminutes long extends to the east-southeast of the galaxy. The halo of the galaxy appears boxy.

NGC 3801 has been found to emit radio waves. It is a compact Fanaroff–Riley type I radio galaxy, with the total extent of the jets being 40 arcseconds. Both jets appear to curve while the core is not visible in observations by the Very Large Array. The radio jets have been found to heat the interstellar medium to a temperature of 1 and 0.7 keV. A linear feature is visible in soft X-rays extending along the jet axis, possibly a tidal tail.

CO imaging indicates the presence of an edge-on disk with a radius 2 kpc perpendicular to the radio jets axis, with a molecular gas mass of 3×10^{8} M_{☉}, about 1% of the dynamical mass of the galaxy. There is also a clump of molecular gas not associated with the disk that appears to fall towards the galaxy. The radio jet axis is aligned with the main HI disk of the galaxy.

When observed in ultraviolet, the galaxy is shaped like an s-shape, with the western half being brighter than the eastern half, indicating the presence of a very warped disk. Both halves extend for 60–70 arcseconds. Small UV clumps appear along the galaxy, that indicate the presence of stars. The age of the stellar population in the clumps is estimated to be between 100 and 500 Myr, with most star forming activity taking place before 400 Myr. The location of the most vigorous starburst appears to be the central region of the galaxy.

In the centre of NGC 3801 lies a supermassive black hole whose mass is estimated to be 10^{8.28 ± 0.31} (93 – 390 millions) M_{☉} based on gas dynamics or 10^{8.43} M_{☉} based on stellar velocity dispersion. The nucleus of the galaxy has been categorised as in between a Seyfert galaxy and a LINER.

== Nearby galaxies ==
NGC 3801 is the foremost galaxy of the galaxy group known as NGC 3801 group or LGG 246. Other members of the group include the galaxies NGC 3768, NGC 3790, NGC 3799, NGC 3800, NGC 3802, NGC 3806, NGC 3827, and NGC 3853. NGC 3802 lies 2.3 arcminutes from NGC 3801 while NGC 3790 lies 7 arcminutes away. HI imaging shows a hydrogen bridge that appears to link NGC 3801 and NGC 3802, indicating the two galaxies are interacting.

== Gallery ==
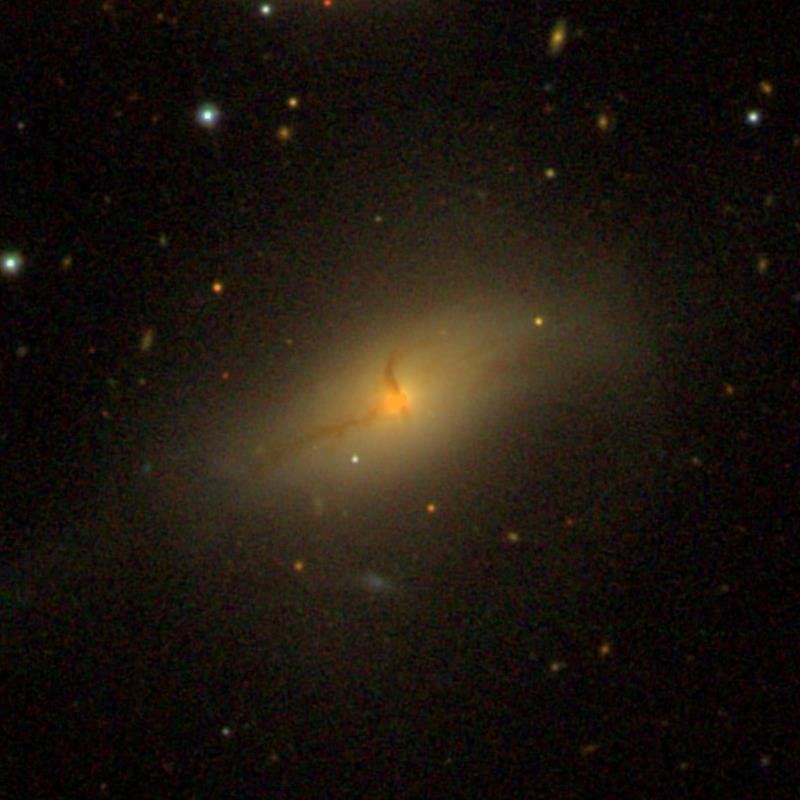
NGC 3801 by Sloan Digital Sky Survey

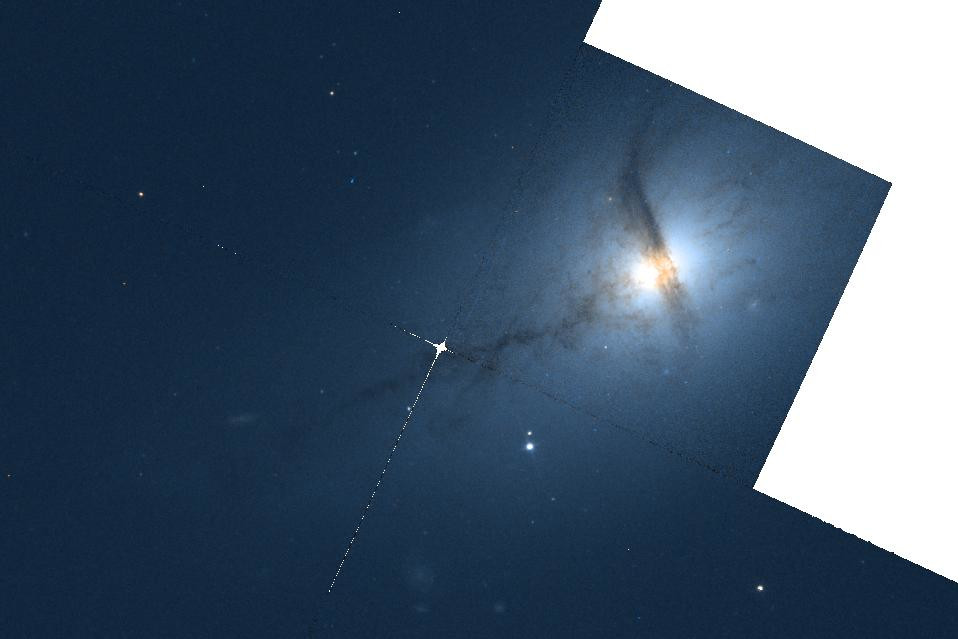
NGC 3801 by the Hubble Space Telescope

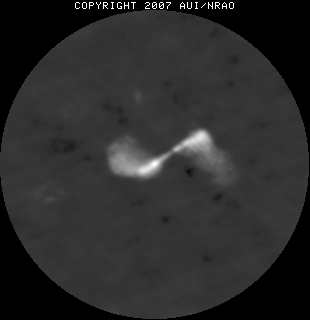
NGC 3801 by the Very Large Array

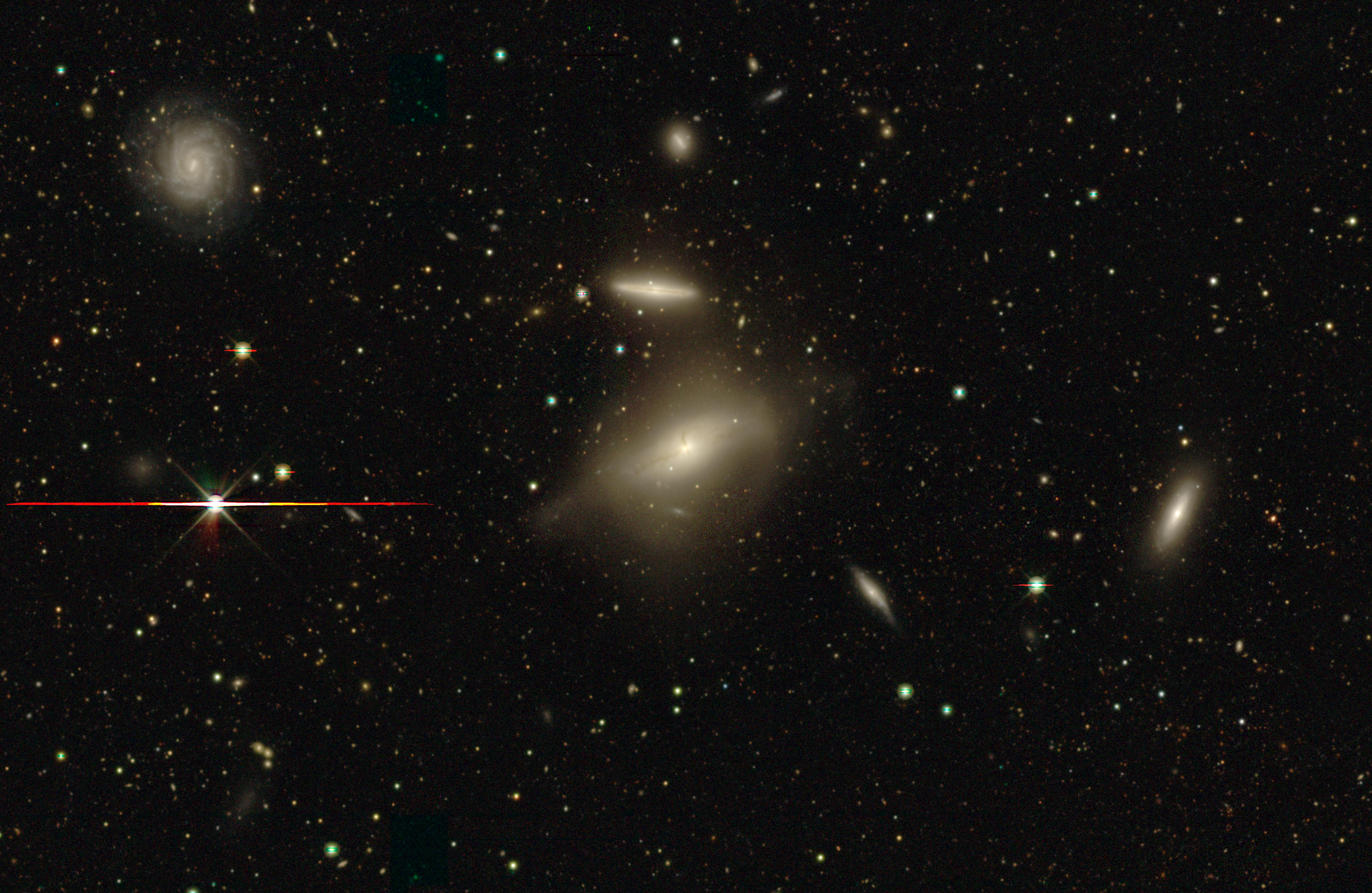
NGC 3801 (middle) and NGC 3790 (right), NGC 3802 (above NGC 3801), NGC 3803 (small galaxy at the top) and NGC 3806 (upper left). Image by the legacy surveys

== See also ==
- 3C 285 - a similar radio galaxy
