= Arp 83 =

Arp 83 is the designation in the Atlas of Peculiar Galaxies for a pair of gravitationally interacting galaxies:

- NGC 3799
- NGC 3800
