= NGC 3665 =

Galaxy in the constellation Ursa Major

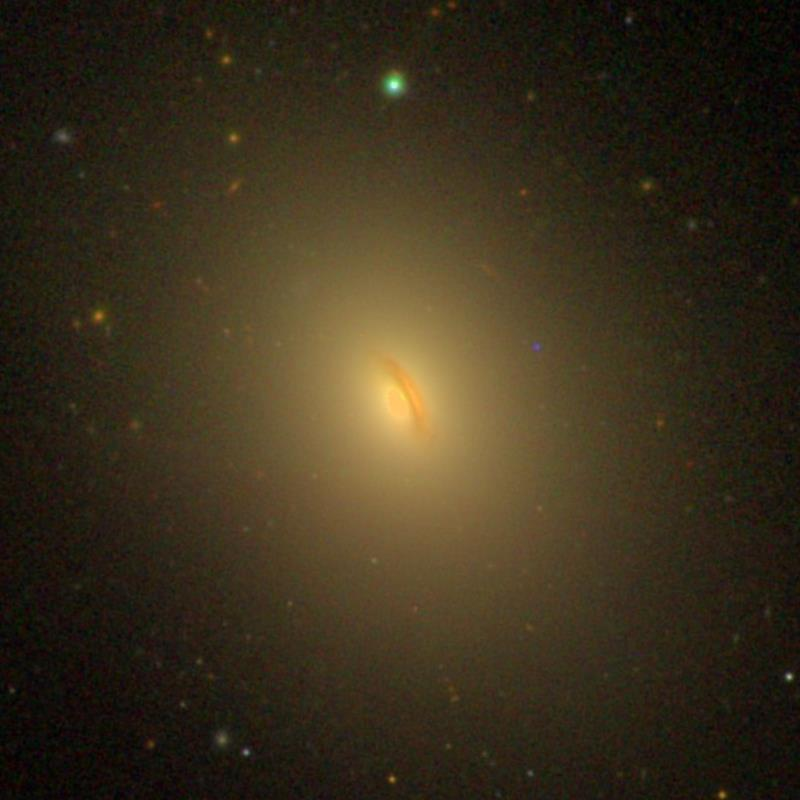
- NGC 3665 by SDSS

Observation data (J2000 epoch)
- Constellation: Ursa Major
- Right ascension: 11^{h} 24^{m} 43.7^{s}
- Declination: +38° 45′ 46″
- Redshift: 0.006901±0.000017
- Heliocentric radial velocity: 2,069±5 km/s
- Distance: 85.6 ± 22 Mly (26.2 ± 6.7 Mpc)
- Apparent magnitude (V): 10.7

Characteristics
- Type: SA(s)0^0^
- Apparent size (V): 4.3′ × 3.3′

Other designations
- NGC 3665, UGC 6426, MCG +07-24-003, PGC 35064, CGCG 214-004

NGC 3665 is a lenticular galaxy located in the northern constellation of Ursa Major. It is located at a distance of circa 85 million light-years from Earth, which, given its apparent dimensions, means that NGC 3665 is about 85,000 light years across. It was discovered by William Herschel on March 23, 1789.

== Characteristics ==
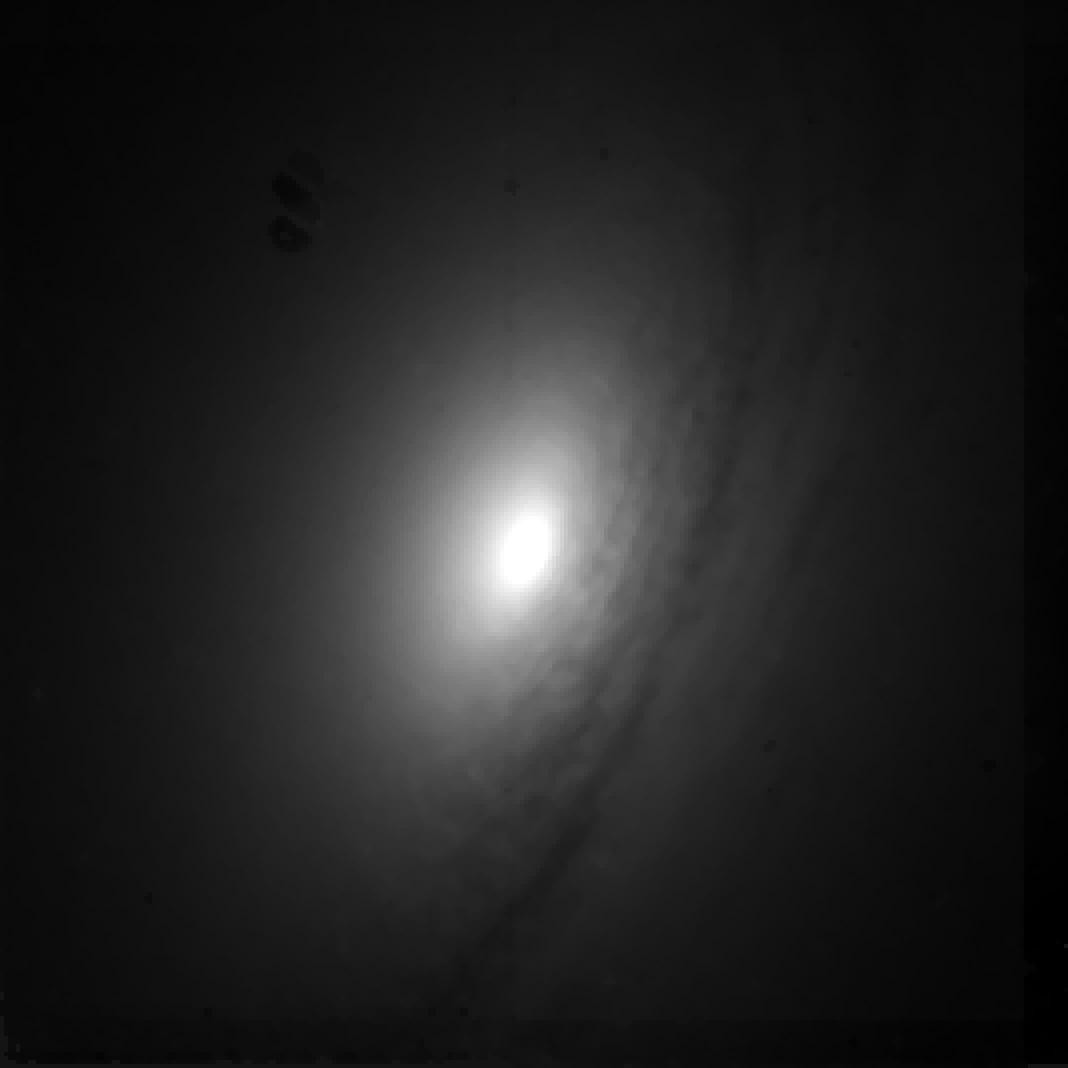
The central region of NGC 3665 by the Hubble Space Telescope, featuring a dust disk.

NGC 3665 is a lenticular galaxy whose disk is characterised by the presence of a circular dust lane. The galaxy has high molecular gas content, as determined by the detection of CO lines. The molecular gas mass in the galaxy is estimated to be 10^{8.91} M_{☉}. The galaxy has a UV excess that indicates the presence of a young stellar population. The total star formation rate in NGC 3665 is estimated to be 1.7 M_{☉} per year. This rate is less than the one expected based on the molecular gas reservoirs of the galaxy. It has been suggested that the compact yet massive bulge of the galaxy has stabilised the cold gas, and thus suppressed star formation.

The nucleus of the galaxy is active and hosts a low luminosity transition active galactic nucleus (AGN). The most accepted theory for the energy source of AGNs is the presence of an accretion disk around a supermassive black hole. The mass of the black hole in the centre of NGC 3665 is measured using the rotation of the molecular gas around the nucleus as 5.75+1.49
−1.18×10^{8} M_{☉}, or 3.8×10^{8} M_{☉} based on the M–sigma relation.

NGC 3665 has been found to emit radio waves. Its emission appears elongated at a position angle perpendicular to the dust lane, with the most luminous region being in the nucleus. The emission extends for more than 5 arcminutes in 610 MHz. In 1.4 GHz, the galaxy has one jet with FRI morphology, that extends for more than 3 kpc. In 5 GHz, emission appears in the nucleus and two jet-like structures. The southeast source has not been resolved, while the northwest extends for 0.7 arcseconds, which corresponds to 120 pc at the distance of NGC 3665. The radio emission is likely associated with a low luminosity AGN.

== Supernova ==
One supernova has been detected in NGC 3665, SN 2002hl. It was discovered by T. Boles in unfiltered CCD images taken on November 5, 2002 with a 0.35-m reflector, as part of the U.K. Nova/Supernova Patrol. The supernova had then a magnitude of 16.3. The spectrum of the supernova obtained on November 5 indicated it was a type Ia supernova about one or two months after maximum light.

== Nearby galaxies ==
NGC 3665 is the brightest member of a galaxy group known as the NGC 3665 group. Other members of the group include NGC 3648, NGC 3652, NGC 3658, and UGC 6433. NGC 3658 lies 15 arcminutes from NGC 3665.
