= NGC 3806 =

Spiral galaxy in the constellation Leo

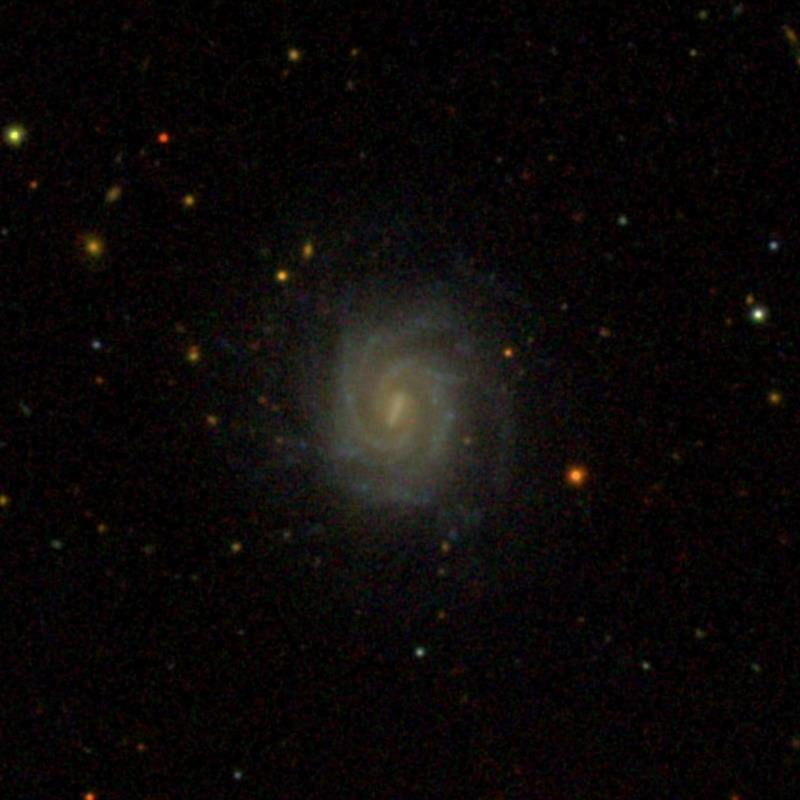
- NGC 3806, as seen during the Sloan Digital Sky Survey

Observation data (J2000 epoch)
- Constellation: Leo
- Right ascension: 11^{h} 40^{m} 46.6976^{s}
- Declination: +17° 47′ 44.959″
- Apparent magnitude (V): 13.6
- Apparent magnitude (B): 14.2
- Surface brightness: 15.09 mag/am^2

Characteristics
- Type: SABb

Other designations
- UGC 6641, MCG +03-30-042, PGC 36231

NGC 3806 is an intermediate spiral galaxy located in the constellation Leo. Its velocity relative to the cosmic microwave background is 3829 ± 24 km/s, which corresponds to a Hubble distance of 56.5 ± 4.0 Mpc (~184 million ly). NGC 3806 was discovered by Prussian astronomer Heinrich d'Arrest in 1862.

Opinions differ on the classification of NGC 3806. The NASA/IPAC and LEDA databases list it as an intermediate spiral and Professor Seligman and Wolfgang Steinicke call it a barred spiral. The luminosity class of NGC 3806 is II and it has a broad HI line.

== NGC 3800 group ==
The galaxy NGC 3806 is part of the NGC 3800 group. This group of galaxies has at least 16 members. Other New General Catalogue galaxies in this group are NGC 3768, NGC 3790, NGC 3799, NGC 3800, NGC 3801, NGC 3802, NGC 3827 and NGC 3853. Other galaxies in the group are UGC 6631, UGC 6653, UGC 6666, UGC 6794, MCG 3-30-33 and MCG 3-30-38.

== See also ==
- List of NGC objects (3001–4000)
