= UGC 2450 =

Type-cD galaxy in the constellation Aries

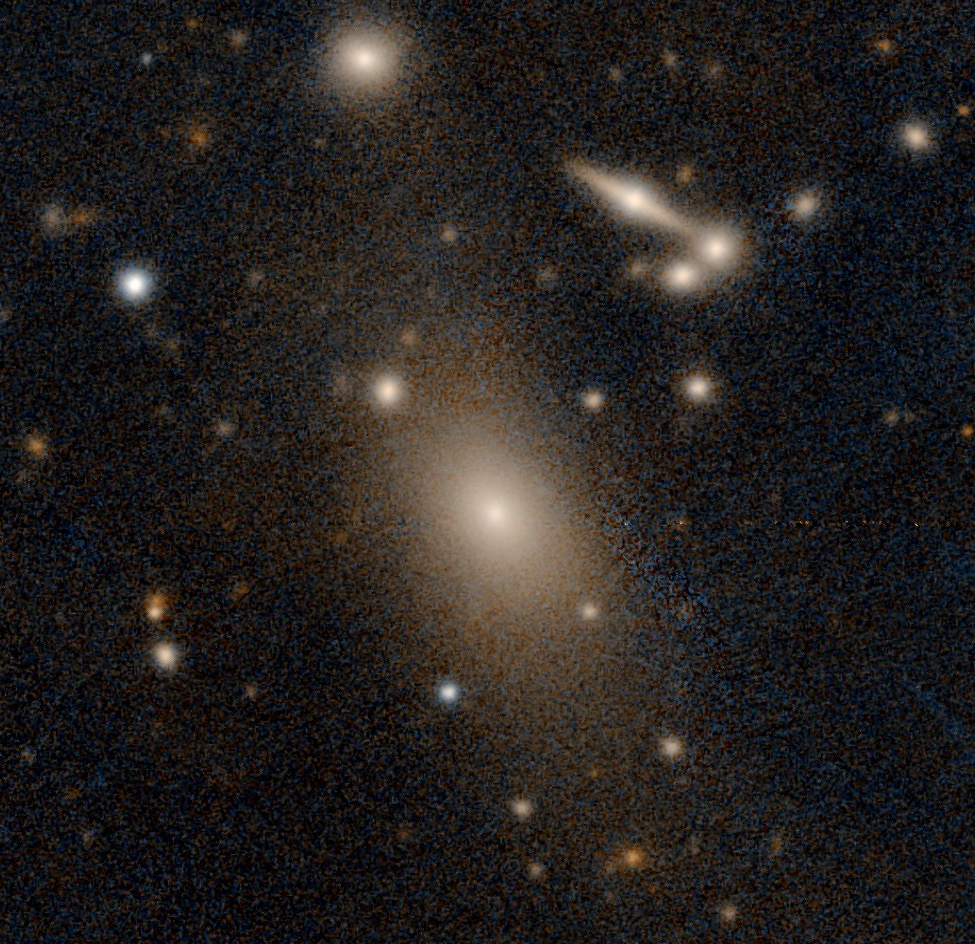
- Pan-STARRS image of the cD galaxy UGC 2450

Observation data (J2000 epoch)
- Constellation: Aries
- Right ascension: 02^{h} 58^{m} 57.89^{s}
- Declination: +13° 34′ 59.37″
- Redshift: 0.071419
- Heliocentric radial velocity: 21411 ± 16 km/s
- Distance: 1,031.8 ± 72.2 Mly (316.36 ± 22.15 Mpc)
- Group or cluster: Abell 401
- magnitude (J): 11.72
- magnitude (H): 11.35

Characteristics
- Type: cD
- Size: ~514,000 ly (157.7 kpc) (estimated)

Other designations
- 2MASX J02585781+1334583, Abell 0401:[FDE2024] BCG, PGC 11277, MCG +02-08-044, RX J0258.9+1334:[ZEH2003] 02

UGC 2450 is an elliptical galaxy of type-cD in the constellation of Aries. The redshift of the galaxy is (z) 0.071 and it was first discovered by astronomers in December 1977. It is the brightest cluster galaxy (BCG) of the Bautz-Morgan Class Type I galaxy cluster, Abell 401.

== Description ==
UGC 2450 is a type-cD galaxy. It contains a central nucleus with a stellar velocity dispersion of around 480 ± 120 kilometers per seconds. The galactic halo has an estimated stellar velocity dispersion of 470 ± 250 kilometers per second. The halo does not show signs of being metal poor based on absorption line strength in its own optical spectrum. The nuclear region is described as both red and faint. The total K-band apparent magnitude for this cD galaxy is estimated to be 10.03 ± 0.04.

A study published in July 1980 based on radio imaging made with the Very Large Array (VLA), has found the cD galaxy is mainly radio-quiet with an absence of both emission lines and a powerful radio source, although the measured radio power is estimated to be <5 × 10^{21} W Hz^{−1}.

There is evidence that a neighboring satellite galaxy might be located near UGC 2450. This galaxy is estimated to have a separation of 20 kiloparsecs with a velocity of 600 kilometers per seconds. A supermassive black hole is present in the center of the cD galaxy with a mass of 10.02 ± 0.03 M_{☉} based on an M–sigma relation between its black hole and stellar budge.
