= 1ES 1741+196 =

BL Lac located in the constellation of Hercules

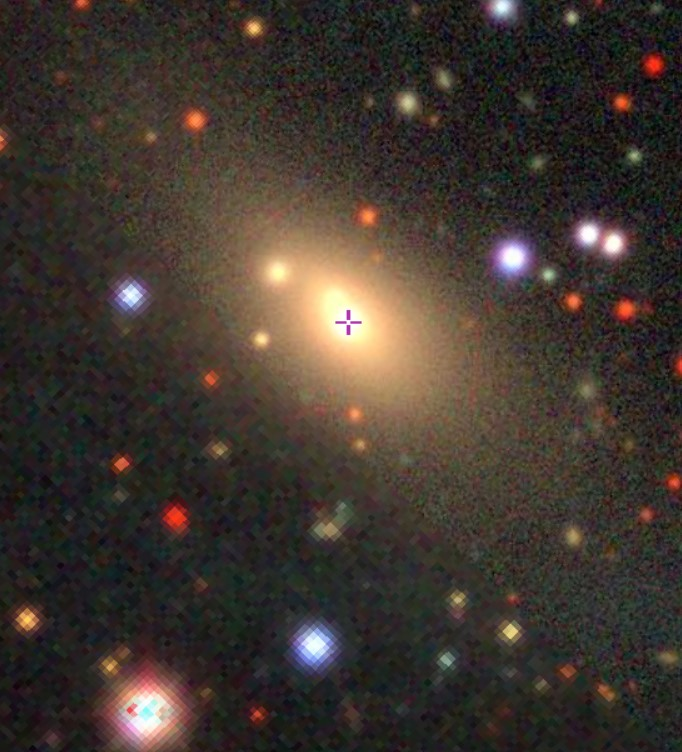
- The BL Lac object 1ES 1741+196.

Observation data (J2000.0 epoch)
- Constellation: Hercules
- Right ascension: 17^{h} 43^{m} 57.83^{s}
- Declination: +19° 35′ 09.01″
- Redshift: 0.084000
- Heliocentric radial velocity: 25,183 km/s
- Distance: 1.217 Gly (373.13 Mpc)
- Apparent magnitude (V): 16.8

Characteristics
- Type: BL Lac
- Size: 103.65 kiloparsecs (338,100 light-years) (diameter; 2MASS K-band total isophote)
- Notable features: Low luminosity blazar

Other designations
- LEDA 1597986, 87GB 174148.7+193615, TXS 1741+196, RX J1743.8+1935, IRCF J174357.8+193509, S3 1741+19, TeV J1743+196

1ES 1741+196 is a BL Lacertae object (BL Lac) located in the constellation of Hercules. It is located 1.2 billion light years from Earth. It was first discovered in 1996 via an Einstein Observatory X-ray satellite. Because the galaxy's synchrotron peak is found above 1 keV, it is categorized as a high-frequency peaked object.

== Characteristics ==
The nucleus of 1ES 1741+196 is active. It has been classified as an extreme blazar due to having a flat high energy gamma ray spectrum or alternatively, a high-energy BL Lac. One accepted theory for this energy source in most active galactic nuclei is a presence of an accretion disk around its supermassive black hole. The mass of the black hole in the center of the galaxy is estimated to be 8.93 ± 0.70 M_{☉} based on a fundamental plane measurement.

Apart from that, 1ES 1741+196 has an isotopic luminosity of ~ 8.2 × 10^{43} erg s^{−1}, making it less luminous amongst other TeV blazars. When observed in very high energy (VHE) band, 1ES 1741+196 shows no evidence of strong flares. Its X-ray spectrum is known to be variable compared to its steady gamma ray spectrum, with it rising up by a factor of 3 in terms of variability.

The host galaxy of 1ES 1741+196 is an elliptical galaxy, one of the largest and brightest BL Lac host galaxies observed. It has a redshift magnitude relation of -24.85 and a galaxy effective radius of 51.2 kiloparsecs, which its overall luminosity distribution is obtained via a de Vaucouleurs profile. Additionally, there are two galaxy companions within the galaxy's position. They have same redshifts, with projected distances of 7.2 and 25.2 kiloparsecs. Given 1ES 1741+196 has a flat luminosity profile, its position along an impact parameter towards the neighbors and a high ellipticity, this suggests tidal forces. Further evidence also shows a presence of a tidal tail between the companions, indicating the three galaxies are interacting.

1ES 1741+196 has an extended radio jet towards the east direction with a projected position angle of °80. The jet is known to be straight despite showing signs of a 5° bend towards south by 15-20 parsecs from its core. Furthermore, the jet is known to be aligned well with a parsec-scale jet.
