= RX J1750.2+3504 BCG =

Brightest cluster galaxy in the constellation Hercules

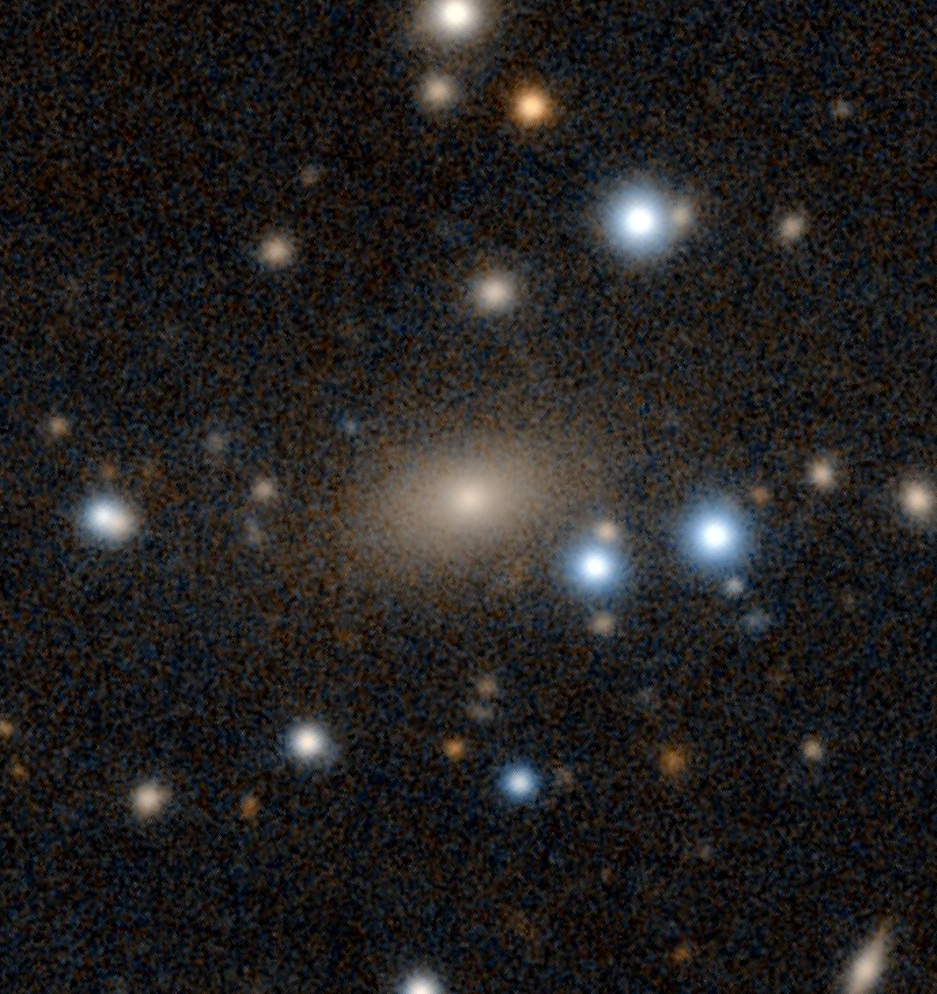
- Pan-STARRS image of RX J1750.2+3504 BCG

Observation data (J2000.0 epoch)
- Constellation: Hercules
- Right ascension: 17^{h} 50^{m} 16.86^{s}
- Declination: +35° 04′ 58.60″
- Redshift: 0.170570
- Heliocentric radial velocity: 51,136 ± 150 km/s
- Distance: 2,472.9 ± 173.4 Mly (758.20 ± 53.17 Mpc)
- Group or cluster: RX J1750.2+3504
- magnitude (J): 13.41
- magnitude (H): 13.07

Characteristics
- Type: BrClG
- Size: ~517,000 ly (158.4 kpc) (estimated)

Other designations
- 2MASX J17501683+3504587, KIG 0834:[VOV2007] 000, RGB J1750+350, RX J1750.2+3505:[CAE99], LEDA 2059126, NVSS J175016+350458

RX J1750.2+3504 BCG (Short for RX J1750.2+3504 Brightest Cluster Galaxy) is a massive elliptical galaxy located in the constellation of Hercules. The redshift of the galaxy is (z) 0.170 and it is the brightest cluster galaxy of the X-ray galaxy cluster, RX J1750.2+3504.

== Description ==
RX J1750.2+3504 BCG is categorized as a central cluster galaxy of RX J1750.2+3504. The optical spectrum of the BCG displays emission lines including singly ionized nitrogen [N II] and singly ionized sulfur [S II] detected in red emission lines. The emission line fluxes for both of these elements are 2.9^{+0.1}_{−0.1} and 0.7^{+0.2}_{−0.1} × 10^{15} erg cm^{−2} s^{−1} respectively. The total hydrogen-alpha emission line luminosity is 41.23 erg s^{−1}.

The BCG hosts a strong radio source, classifying it as a radio galaxy. The source appears mainly core-dominated and it has a flat radio spectrum. The radio core is estimated to have a total flux density of 31.9 mJy. The flux contribution of the core at 10 GHz frequencies is 26.3 ± 4.1 mJy with a flat index at 0.47 ± 0.03. The non-core component at 1 GHz frequencies is less than 25.4 mJy. The radio emission of the BCG is mainly core-dominated too, with a total radio flux of 69 mJy at 1.4 GHz. The BCG is offset from the X-ray emission peak by 27.8 kiloparsecs.

The supermassive black hole lying inside the center of the BCG has a mass of 9.91 ± 0.04 M_{☉} based on calculation of its K-band bulge luminosity. with another study estimating the black hole mass as 11.08 ± 0.15 M_{☉} according to a fundamental plane measurement. The total absolute K-band magnitude of the bulge is estimated to be -27.3 ± 0.05, with the stellar bulge having a stellar mass of 12.17 ± 0.04 M_{☉}.
