= LBQS 1009−0252 =

Quasar in the constellation Sextans

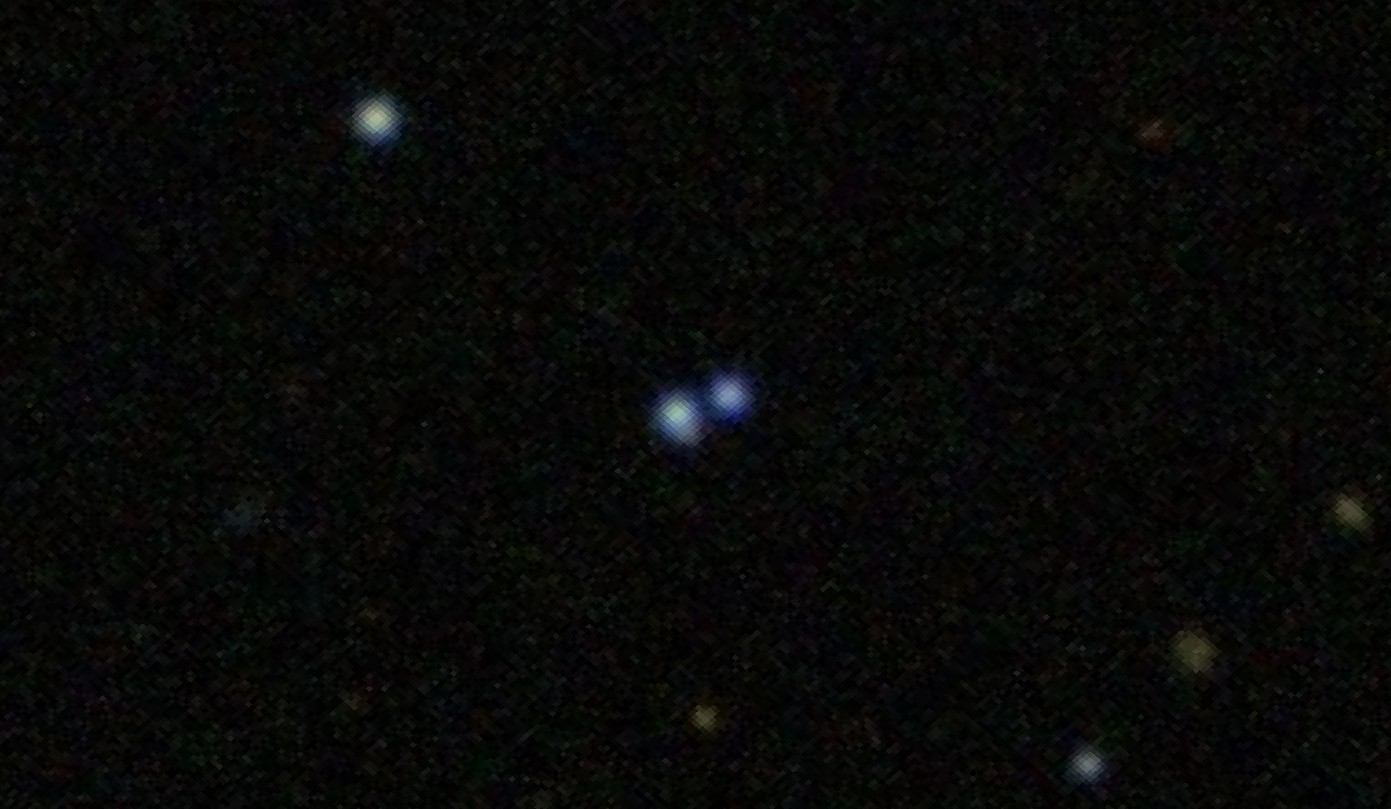
- SDSS image of LBQS 1009−0252

Observation data (J2000.0 epoch)
- Constellation: Sextans
- Right ascension: 10^{h} 12^{m} 15.80^{s}
- Declination: −03° 07′ 02.00″
- Redshift: 2.739000
- Heliocentric radial velocity: 821,132 km/s
- Distance: 10.941 Gly
- Apparent magnitude (V): 18.71
- Apparent magnitude (B): 18.82

Characteristics
- Type: QSO

Other designations
- 2MASSI J1012158−030702, QSO B1009−0252, 2MASS J10121588−0307031

LBQS 1009−0252 also Q1009−0252, is a gravitationally-lensed quasar located in the constellation of Sextans. It has a redshift of (z) 2.73 and it was first discovered by J. Surdej in February 1994 and later described a close-separation quasar pair with magnitudes of 18.2 and 21.2 by a team of astronomers led by P.C. Hewitt, the same year.

== Description ==
LBQS 1009−0252 consists of two bright quasars labelled A and B, having a separation gap of 1.53 ± 0.01 arcseconds. When imaged, they are separated into two components and lensed by an elliptical galaxy located at a redshift of (z) 0.871, confirmed by Very Large Telescope observations who found it closer to the fundamental plane redshift measurement calculated by C.S. Kochanek. A third quasar labelled C, is found at (z) 1.627 although it is fainter and possibly not relating to the pair. Observations determined the host galaxy of C is mainly responsible for the dominant cosmic shear contribution based on modelling of a isothermal ellipsoid although external shearing is contributed based on an isothermal sphere model by Claeskens with an orientation in the position angle of 11 ± 6 degrees.

Ground-based observations and by Hubble Space Telescope have showed LBQS 1009−0252 has time-delays. Based on results, the time delay is found approximately 120.8 h^{−1}_{65} with the A component shown as the leading component based on estimation of the lens galaxy's redshift. Multicolor photometric light curves also showed both the A and B components of the quasars, do display some variations with the B component brightening up and the A component becoming slightly dimmer. This suggests a switch in the blue part of the spectrum in one of the quasars.

Several absorption line systems have been identified in both A and B components of the quasars. When investigated, astronomers found these absorption lines are found rich in magnesium and iron oxides with redshifts of (z) 0.869 and (z) 1.627. Further evidence also pointed out the magnesium absorption system is extended by 40 h_{50}^{−1} kiloparsecs, coinciding with the third quasar which in turn further extends outwards from it by 45 h_{50}^{−1} kiloparsecs. More emission lines at (z) 2.739 and 2.740 are also discovered.
