= 1ES 0229+200 =

BL Lacertae object located in the constellation Aries

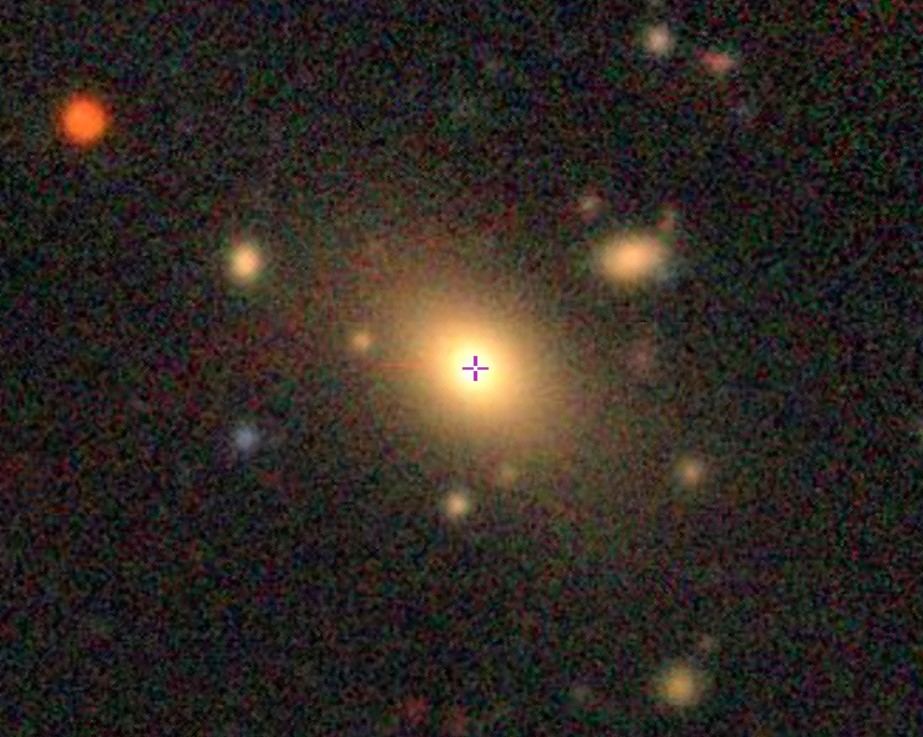
- The BL Lac object 1ES 0229+200.

Observation data (J2000.0 epoch)
- Constellation: Aries
- Right ascension: 02^{h} 32^{m} 48.61^{s}
- Declination: +20° 17′ 17.49″
- Redshift: 0.140000
- Heliocentric radial velocity: 41,971 km/s
- Distance: 1.945 Gly (596.33 Mpc)
- Apparent magnitude (V): 18.0
- Apparent magnitude (B): 18.0

Characteristics
- Type: BL Lac
- Size: 98.23 kiloparsecs (320,400 light-years) (diameter; 2MASS K-band total isophote)
- Notable features: High frequency-peaked BL Lac object

Other designations
- BZB J0232+2017, LEDA 1622767, RX J0232.8+2017, NVSS J023248+201716

1ES 0229+200 is a relatively distant BL Lacertae object (BL Lac) located in the constellation of Aries, 1.9 billion light years from Earth. It has a redshift of 0.140, and was discovered by astronomers in 1992 who conducted the Einstein IPC Slew Survey. It belongs to a class of high frequency-peaked BL Lac objects.

== Characteristics ==
1ES 0229+200 has an active galactic nucleus. It is classified either an extreme TeV blazar or an unusual high synchrotron peaked object, exhibiting a high synchrotron peak frequency of v_{syn} ~ 10^{19} Hz. It also shows X-ray polarization with a polarization degree found significantly higher, compared to the first IXPE observation on Markarian 501 but similar to the observation conducted on Markarian 421.

1ES 0229+200 contains a hard intrinsic spectrum with a spectral index inside an energy range betwixt ~ 0.5 TeV and ~ 15 TeV. Because of its hard spectrum, the galaxy was used as a primary source to examine extragalactic background light and intergalactic magnetic fields.

The host galaxy of 1ES 0229+200 is a relatively normal elliptical galaxy without any visible galaxy companions within its position. It has a half-light radius estimated r_{e} = 3.25 ± 0.07" with a brightness of m_{host,R} = 15.85 ± 0.01 magnitude. The supermassive black hole in the center of 1ES 0229+220 is 9.38 ± 9.08 M_{☉} based on a fundamental plane measurement. However a study paper published in 2005, re-estimated the black hole mass as 8.68 ± 0.13 M_{☉} according to a mass-dispersion of (M_{☉} ^{−}σ) value and a fundamental plane relation.

1ES 0229+200 contains two radio jets, comprising a parsec-scale jet and a kiloparsec-scale jet; the former which it is aligned to. Both of the jets located north and south, are found to be curved towards a west direction and they have position angles of -10° and 180° respectively. There is also a compact radio source that is found unresolved about 100" to the north.

A gamma ray signal has been found at a distance of less than 3° from 1ES 0229+200. Although no clear associations are found relating with the signal, it has a point-like nature and a steep energy spectrum.
