= B2 1113+24 =

Radio galaxy in the constellation of Leo

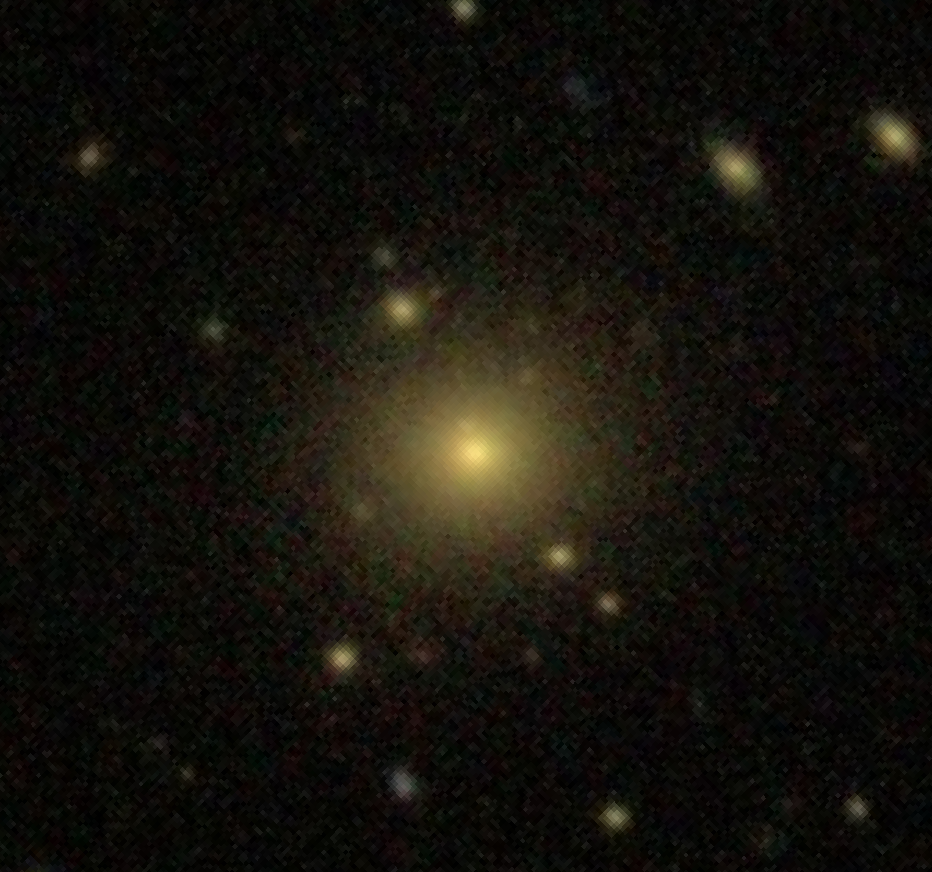
- SDSS image of B2 1113+24

Observation data (J2000.0 epoch)
- Constellation: Leo
- Right ascension: 11^{h} 16^{m} 03.80^{s}}
- Declination: +24° 41′ 02.18″}
- Redshift: 0.102228
- Heliocentric radial velocity: 30,647 ± 6 km/s
- Distance: 1,491.1 ± 104.4 Mly (457.16 ± 32.00 Mpc)
- Group or cluster: Zw 1113.0+2452
- magnitude (J): 12.96

Characteristics
- Type: E AGN:
- Size: ~500,000 ly (153.2 kpc) (estimated)

Other designations
- 2MASX J11160377+2441018, 7C 1113+2457, PGC 34365, NVSS J111603+244104, OGC 0533, WHL J111603.8+244102 BCG

B2 1113+24 is a radio galaxy located in the constellation of Leo. The redshift of the galaxy is (z) 0.102 and it was first discovered as an astronomical radio source in September 1972 by astronomers.

== Description ==
B2 1113+24 is a radio galaxy of low luminosity. The host is an elliptical galaxy with a rounded appearance and is the brightest cluster galaxy (BCG) of the galaxy cluster, Zw 1113.0+2452. A faint companion is three arcseconds away to the north. A study found no presence of dust features in the galaxy. The total r-band luminosity is magnitude 9.7 based on the r-band luminosity value calculated by the Sloan Digital Sky Survey (SDSS).

Radio imaging made with the Very Large Array (VLA) shows the source has a small angular size. It has a halo structure that is mainly complex as well as a steep radio spectrum. A-array observations at 20 centimeters detected two components located in both north and south directions with flux densities of 10 and 14 mJy respectively. A radio core has been detected with a flux density less than 0.3 mJy. There is no detection of a radio jet.

The core fundamental plane of the galaxy has a rotation speed of 180 kilometers per second within five arcseconds of the core region. The supermassive black hole in the center of the galaxy has a mass of 9.25 M_{☉}, while the estimated age of the galaxy is 10.0 × 10^{9} years.
