= SDSS J1011+5442 =

Quasar in the constellation Ursa Major

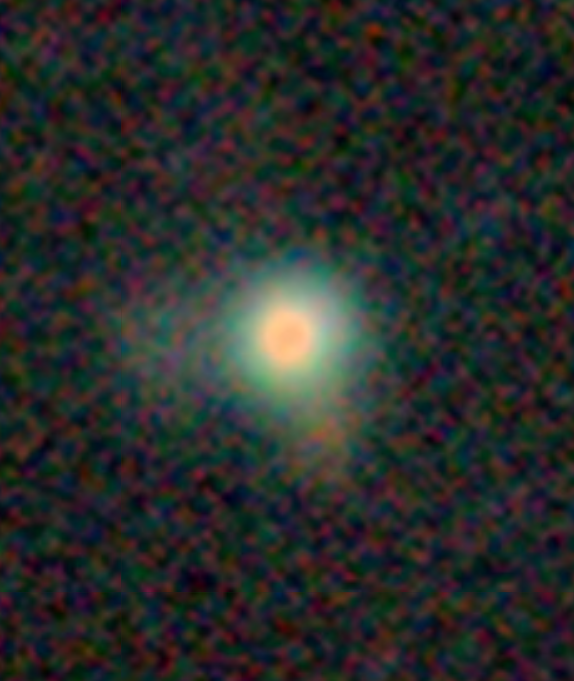
- The quasar SDSS J1011+5442

Observation data (J2000.0 epoch)
- Constellation: Ursa Major
- Right ascension: 10^{h} 11^{m} 52.99^{s}
- Declination: +54° 42′ 06.36″
- Redshift: 0.246389
- Heliocentric radial velocity: 73,866 km/s ± 7
- Distance: 3.000 Gly
- Apparent magnitude (V): 18.31

Characteristics
- Type: AGN1
- Size: ~169,900 ly (52.08 kpc) (estimated)

Other designations
- 2MASS J10115298+5442063, SDSS J101152.98+544206.3, LEDA 3509752

SDSS J1011+5442 (full name SDSS J101152.98+544206.4) is a quasar located in the constellation of Ursa Major. The redshift of the object is (z) 0.246 and it was first discovered in the Sloan Digital Sky Survey (SDSS) by astronomers in 2003. This quasar has also been referred to as changing-look.

== Description ==
The active galactic nucleus (AGN) of the quasar has been described as changing-look. It was in a bright state when it was first observed in January 2003 as a Type 1 AGN, with its main optical spectrum displaying typical characteristics of a broad-line quasar, mainly broad emission lines and a blue continuum. When observed again in 2015, it was in a dim state, changing it to a Type 1.9 AGN from Type 1 AGN with the spectrum only displaying hydrogen alpha (Hα) emission lines at weaker state, while the hydrogen beta emission lines (Hβ) vanished completely. During its dim state, it exhibited the presence of Hα emission best described by a narrow single component, two narrow Gaussian components and a single broad Gaussian component that is found offset by around 100 kilometers per seconds. By 2024, it had reverted to its original Type 1 state, with its Hβ lines appearing again. The mass of the central black hole of the quasar is estimated to be 7.28 ± 0.15 M_{☉} based on the M-sigma relation. Other studies estimated the black hole as 3.6 ± 0.2 × 10^{7} M_{☉}. A theory also suggested that its bright appearance is likely caused by a tidal disruption event (TDE) when its black hole rips apart a star that has passed too close to it.

The host galaxy of SDSS J1011+5442 has been described as having an irregular appearance, suggesting it underwent a recent galaxy merger with another galaxy, which was confirmed based on the presence of tidal stream features. Other signs of the merger included a diffused tidal tail in the north, and a ring-like tidal feature orientated east to west. There is also the presence of doubly ionized oxygen radio emission. The total stellar mass of the quasar is estimated to be 1.01^{1.09}_{0.93} × 10^{10} M_{☉}.

A study published in 2017 found SDSS J1011+5442 has low polarization levels, which is usual for any of the Type 1 unobscured quasars. This indicates it is not caused by any obscuration in its torus or either its own broad line region. But it could also be that it was also seen at a low inclination angle so much that its scattering regions look as asymmetric away from the position of any lines of sight that crosses the torus region.
