= NGC 2911 =

Peculiar lenticular galaxy in the constellation Leo

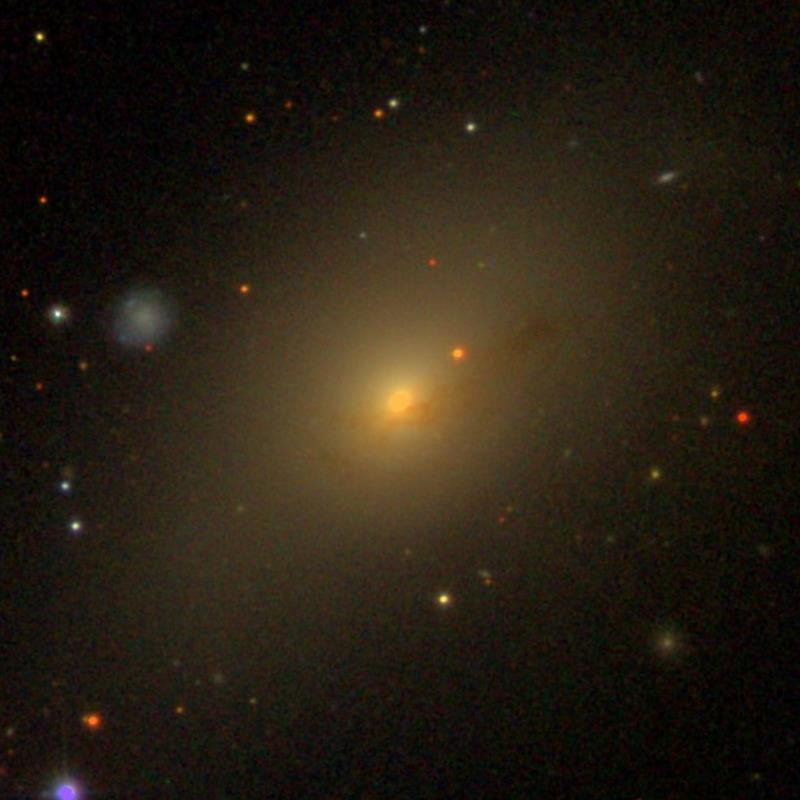
- NGC 2911 by Sloan Digital Sky Survey

Observation data (J2000 epoch)
- Constellation: Leo
- Right ascension: 09^{h} 33^{m} 46.1^{s}
- Declination: +10° 09′ 09″
- Redshift: 0.010777 ± 0.000007
- Heliocentric radial velocity: 3,231 ± 2 km/s
- Distance: 145 Mly (48.5 Mpc)
- Apparent magnitude (V): 11.5

Characteristics
- Type: SA(s)0:pec
- Apparent size (V): 4.1′ × 3.2′

Other designations
- UGC 5092, Arp 232, MCG +02-25-003, PGC 27159

NGC 2911 is a peculiar lenticular galaxy in the constellation Leo. The galaxy lies about 145 million light years away from Earth, which means, given its apparent dimensions, that NGC 2911 is approximately 165,000 light years across. It was discovered by William Herschel on March 11, 1784.

The galaxy features dust lanes. The kinematic axis of the molecular gas of the galaxy is not aligned with the stellar one, indicating it is of external origin. The nucleus of the galaxy has been found to be active and it is categorised as a type 2 LINER. The most accepted theory for the energy source of active galactic nuclei is the presence of an accretion disk around a supermassive black hole. The supermassive black hole in the nucleus of NGC 5953 is estimated to have a mass of 2.7×10^{8} M_{☉} based on stellar velocity dispersion. A one-sided jet measuring about half parsec in length is visible in radiowaves.

NGC 2911 is the foremost member of a galaxy group known as NGC 2911 group or LGG 177. Other members of the group include the galaxies NGC 2912, NGC 2913, NGC 2914, and NGC 2939. NGC 2912 lies at a distance of 1.3 arcminutes while NGC 2914 lies at a distance of 4.8 arcminutes. NGC 2919 appears next to the group but it isn't a member of it. A bit further away from the NGC 2911 group lies NGC 2872 and its group, the UGC 5189 group and the CGCG 063-066 group.

== Gallery ==
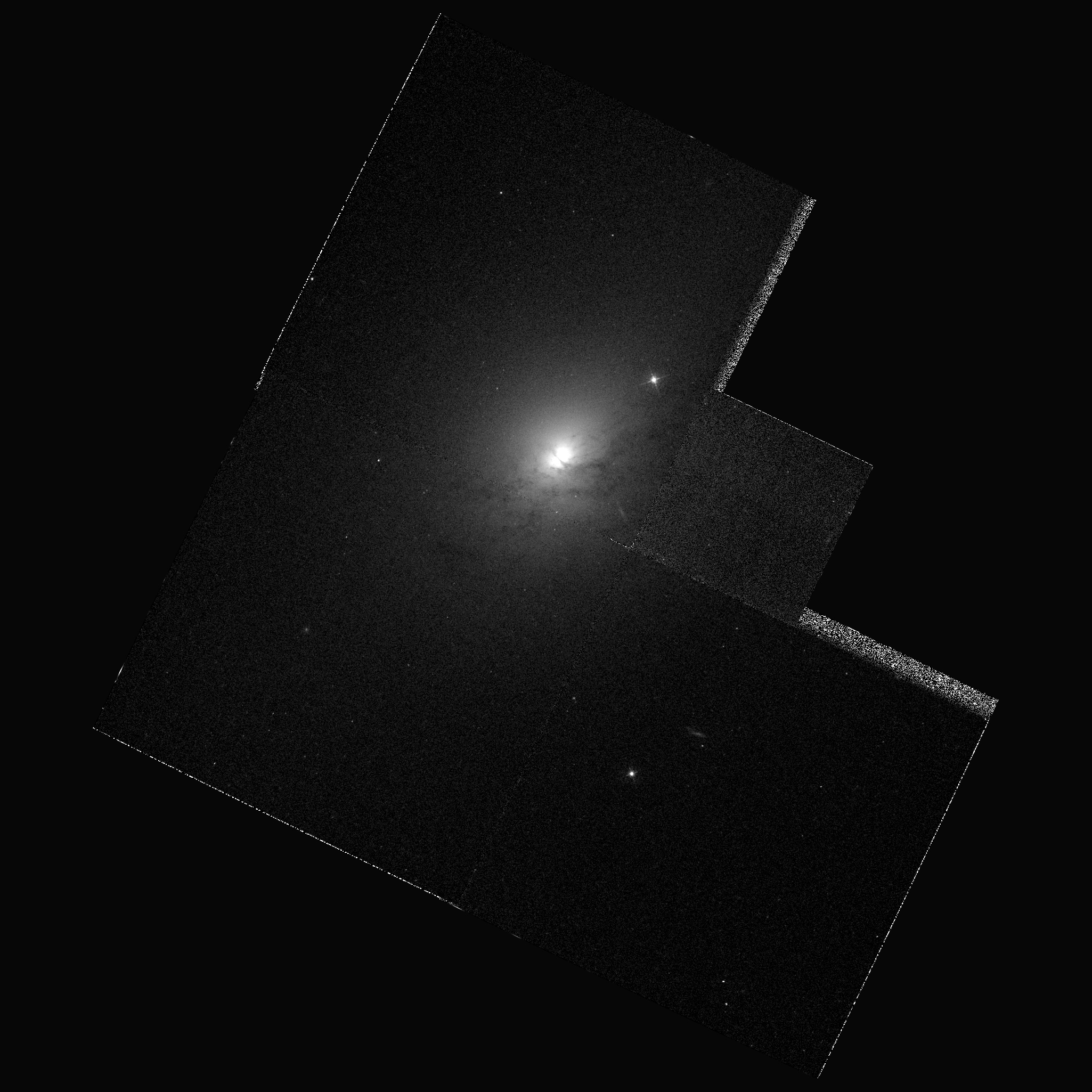
NGC 2911 by the Hubble Space Telescope

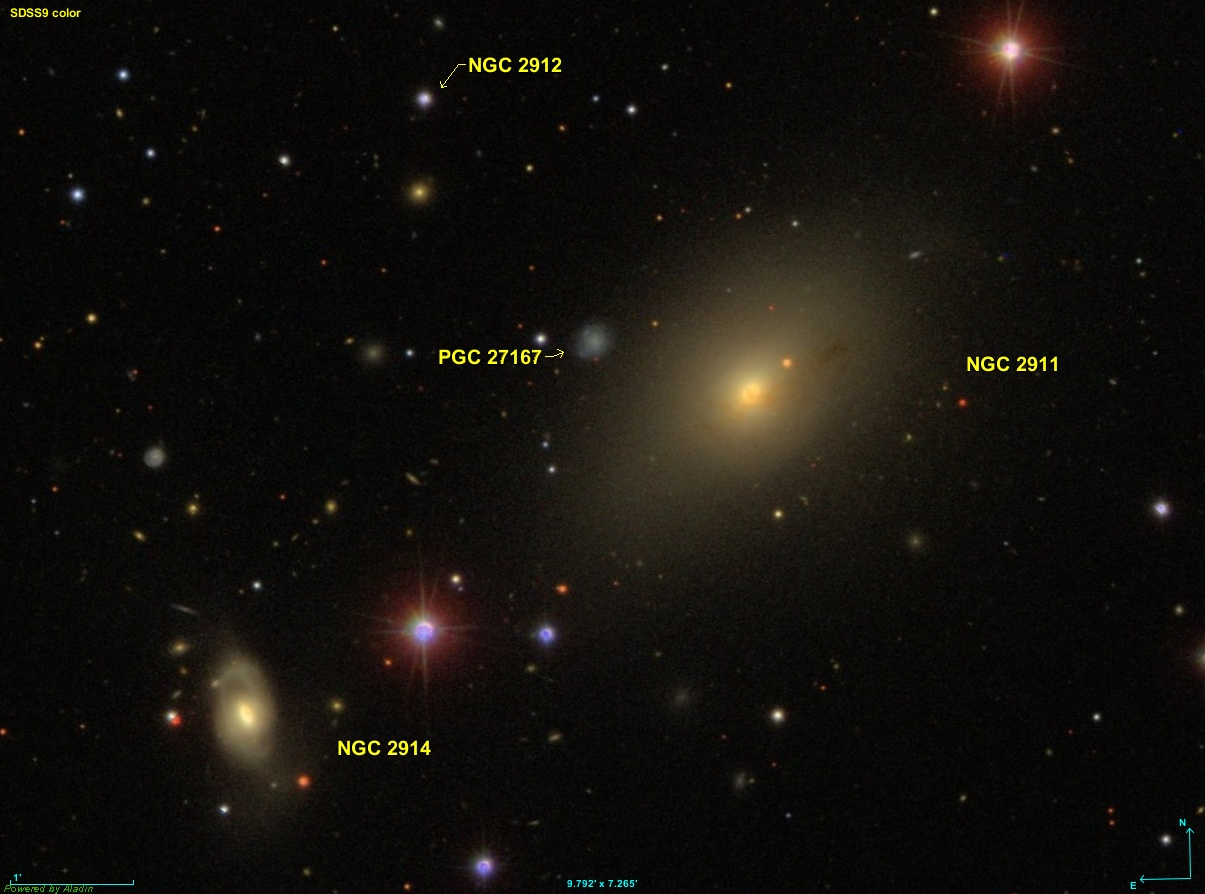
Labelled image of the NGC 2911 group

== See also ==
- NGC 1947 – a similar galaxy
