= Abell 2009 BCG =

Brightest cluster galaxy in the constellation Boötes

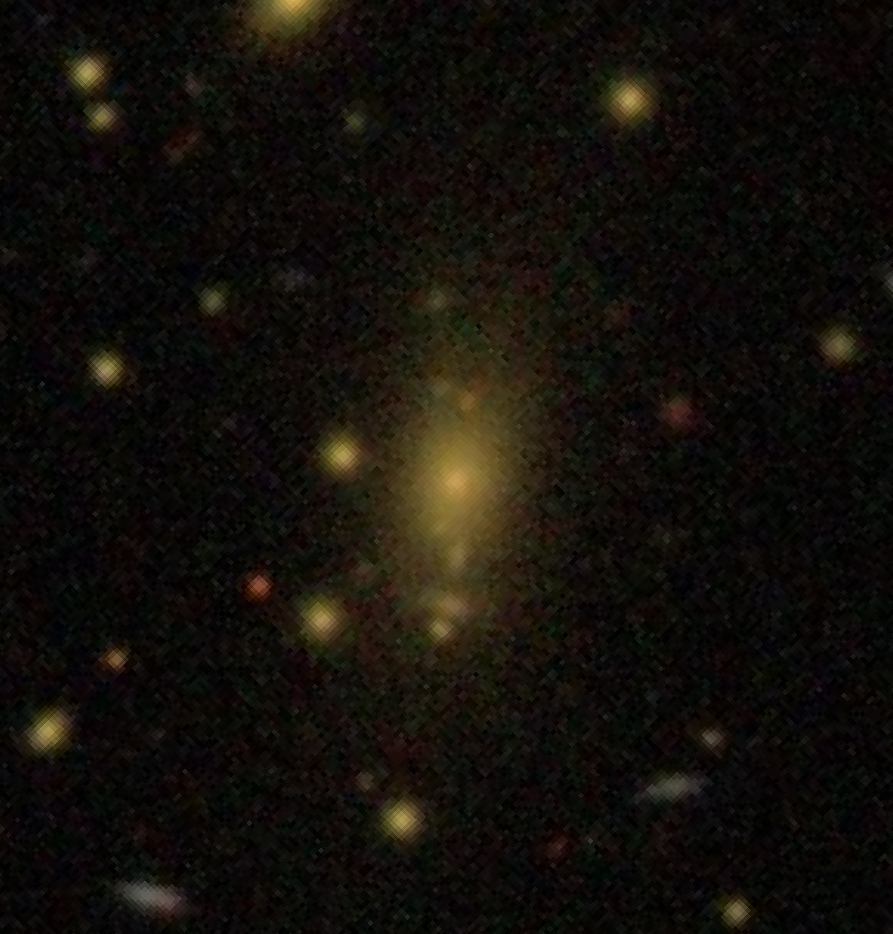
- SDSS image of Abell 2009 BCG

Observation data (J2000.0 epoch)
- Constellation: Boötes
- Right ascension: 15^{h} 00^{m} 19.52^{s}
- Declination: +21° 22′ 09.87″
- Redshift: 0.151928
- Heliocentric radial velocity: 45,547 ± 22 km/s
- Distance: 2,213.6 ± 155.0 Mly (678.70 ± 47.51 Mpc)
- Group or cluster: Abell 2009
- Magnitude (J): 13.89
- Magnitude (H): 12.74

Characteristics
- Type: BrCIG
- Size: ~591,000 ly (181.3 kpc) (estimated)

Other designations
- 2MASX J15001950+2122108, Abell 2009:[CAC2009] BCM, LEDA 140447, OGC 0698, MaxBCG J225.08133+21.36941 BCG, RX J1500.3+2122:[BEV98] 010

Abell 2009 BCG (short for Abell 2009 Brightest Cluster Galaxy) is a massive elliptical galaxy residing as the brightest cluster galaxy (BCG) of the galaxy cluster, Abell 2009. The redshift of the galaxy is (z) 0.151 and it was first discovered by astronomers in July 1999, who observed emission lines in its optical spectrum.

== Description ==
Abell 2009 BCG is the dominant galaxy of Abell 2009. The central nucleus of the BCG is found to be active and it has been classified as a Fanaroff-Riley Class Type I radio galaxy based on radio imaging made with the Very Large Array (VLA) at 1.5 GHz frequencies. It has a resolved radio core and a pair of butterfly-shaped radio lobes 17 kiloparsecs in length. Both of the lobes are orientated from the northwest direction towards the southeast direction.

The total radio flux density of the BCG is estimated to be 23 ± 1.0 mJy with radio power being calculated as 1.45 ± 0.06 × 10^{24} W Hz^{−1}. The radio core flux density at 10 GHz frequencies is 3.3 ± 1.4 mJy, with the steep index spectrum being 1.81 ± 0.05. The emission is associated with another radio galaxy in the cluster, located 50 arcseconds away from the BCG.

The BCG has an elliptical appearance according to Hubble Space Telescope (HST) imaging data. The supermassive black hole lying in the center of the BCG is estimated to be 9.74 ± 0.08 M_{☉} based on a calculation of the fundamental plane relation with the total stellar mass of 12.17 ± 0.04 M_{☉}. The infrared luminosity of the BCG has been calculated as less than 1.0 × 10^{44} erg s^{−1}, making it somehow less luminous compared to others. A study published in 2024, has found the BCG is offset from the X-ray center by about 7 kiloparsecs.
