= NGC 3799 =

Galaxy in the constellation Leo

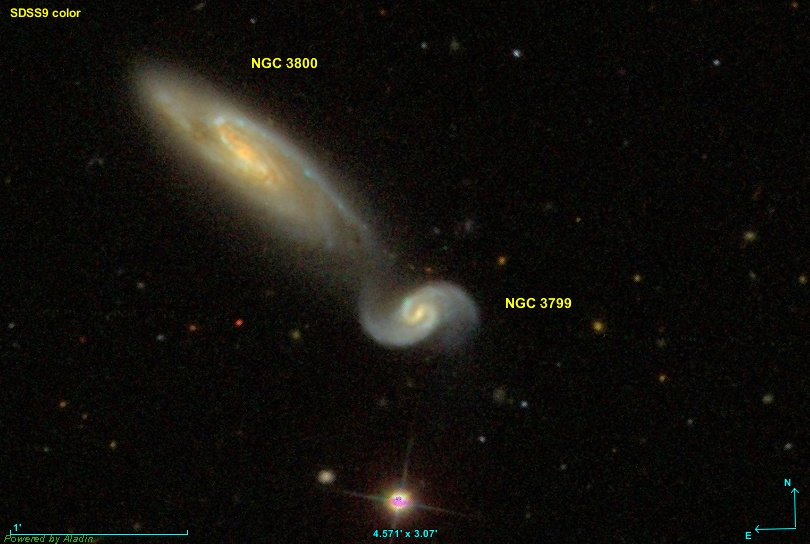
- NGC 3800 (large galaxy, center) and NGC 3799 (small galaxy, right)

Observation data (J2000 epoch)
- Constellation: Leo
- Right ascension: 11^{h} 40^{m} 09.4219^{s}
- Declination: 15° 19′ 38.434″
- Redshift: 0.011048
- Heliocentric radial velocity: 3294 ± 7 km/s
- Apparent magnitude (V): 13,9
- Apparent magnitude (B): 14,7
- Surface brightness: 12,76 mag/am2

Characteristics
- Type: SB(s)c

Other designations
- Arp 83B, UGC 6630, MCG +03-30-037, PGC 36193

NGC 3799 is a barred spiral galaxy located in the constellation Leo. Its speed relative to the cosmic microwave background is 3,659 ± 24 km/s, which corresponds to a Hubble distance of 54.0 ± 3.8 Mpc (~176 million ly). NGC 3799 was discovered by British astronomer John Herschel in 1832.

NGC 3799 and NGC 3800 are two gravitationally interacting galaxies and appear in Halton Arp's Atlas of Peculiar Galaxies under the symbol Arp 83. Halton Arp describes these as an example of galaxies by presenting a bridge of matter between them and having a high surface gloss.

The luminosity class of NGC 3799 is II and it has a broad HI line. According to the SIMBAD database, NGC 3799 is a LINER galaxy, that is to say a galaxy whose nucleus presents an emission spectrum characterized by broad lines of weakly ionized atoms.

To date, a non-redshift measurement gives a distance of approximately 47 Mpc (~153 million ly). This value is far outside the Hubble distance values. Note, however, that it is with the average value of independent measurements, when they exist, that the NASA/IPAC database calculates the diameter of a galaxy.

== NGC 3800 group ==
NGC 3799 is part of a group of galaxies that has at least 16 members which make up what is commonly known as the NGC 3800 group. Other galaxies in this group are NGC 3768, NGC 3790, NGC 3800, NGC 3801, NGC 3802, NGC 3806, NGC 3827 and NGC 3853. The other galaxies in the group are UGC 6631, UGC 6653, UGC 6666, UGC 6794, MCG 3-30-33 and MCG 3-30-388.

Abraham Mahtessian also mentions the existence of this group, but only the galaxies NGC 3768, NGC 3790, NGC 3801 and NGC 3827 appear there. The galaxy NGC 3853 appears in Mahtessian's article, but under another entry where it forms a galaxy pair with UGC 6666, designated as 1139+1618 (CGCG 1139.7+1648). Similarly, the galaxies NGC 3799 and NGC 3800 are also listed under another entry in this article as a pair of galaxies.

== See also ==
- List of NGC objects (3001–4000)
- Atlas of Peculiar Galaxies
