= NGC 3800 =

Galaxy in the constellation Leo

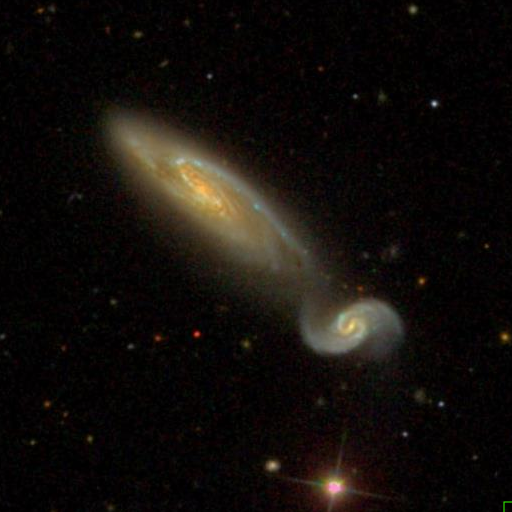
- NGC 3800 (large galaxy, center) and NGC 3799 (small galaxy, right)

Observation data (J2000 epoch)
- Constellation: Leo (constellation)
- Right ascension: 11^{h} 40^{m} 13.4775^{s}
- Declination: 15° 20′ 31.884″
- Apparent magnitude (V): 12.7
- Apparent magnitude (B): 13.5
- Surface brightness: 12.90 mag/am2

Characteristics
- Type: SAB(rs)b? pec

Other designations
- PGC 36197, UGC 6634, MCG +03-30-039, CGCG 97-49, KCPG 296B, Arp 83, VV 350, KUG 1137+156B, IRAS 11376+1537

NGC 3800 is an intermediate spiral galaxy located in the constellation Leo. Its speed relative to the cosmic microwave background is 3,653 ± 24 km/s, which corresponds to a Hubble distance of 53.9 ± 3.8 Mpc (~176 million ly). NGC 3800 was discovered by German-British astronomer William Herschel in 1784.

NGC 3799 and NGC 3800 are two gravitationally interacting galaxies and appear in Halton Arp's Atlas of Peculiar Galaxies under the symbol Arp 83. Halton Arp describes these as an example of galaxies by presenting a bridge of matter between them and having a high surface gloss.

The luminosity class of NGC 3800 is II and it has a broad HI line.

To date, four non-redshift measurements give a distance of 42.125 ± 1.162 Mpc (~137 million ly), which is well outside the Hubble distance values. Note, however, that it is with the average value of independent measurements, when they exist, that the NASA/IPAC database calculates the diameter of a galaxy and that consequently the diameter of NGC 3800 could be approximately 32.8 kpc (~107,000 ly) if we used the Hubble distance to calculate it.

== NGC 3800 group ==
The galaxy NGC 3800 is part of a group of galaxies named after him. The NGC 3800 group has at least 16 members. Other New General Catalog galaxies in this group are NGC 3768, NGC 3790, NGC 3799, NGC 3801, NGC 3802, NGC 3806, NGC 3827 and NGC 3853. Other galaxies in the group are UGC 6631, UGC 6653, UGC 6666, UGC 6794, MCG 3-30-33 and MCG 3-30-38.

Abraham Mahtessian also mentions the existence of this group, but only the galaxies NGC 3768, NGC 3790, NGC 3801 and NGC 3827 appear there. The galaxy NGC 3853 appears in Mahtessian's article, but under another entry where it forms a galaxy pair with UGC 6666, designated as 1139+1618 (CGCG 1139.7+1648). Similarly, the galaxies NGC 3799 and NGC 3800 are also listed under another entry in this article as a pair of galaxies.

The NASA/IPAC database indicates that NGC 3800 is possibly a field galaxy, that is, it does not belong to a cluster or group and is therefore gravitationally isolated. Scientists have concluded that this is most likely not the case.

== See also ==
- List of NGC objects (3001–4000)
- Atlas of Peculiar Galaxies
