= Robert Jackson (astronomer) =

American astronomer

Robert Earl Jackson (born 1949) is a scientist, who, with Sandra Faber, in 1976 discovered the Faber–Jackson relation between the luminosity of an elliptical galaxy and the velocity dispersion in its center.

Jackson was a graduate student at the University of California, Santa Cruz. As a research assistant for Faber, he contributed to the data analysis on the project that led to the Faber–Jackson relation (1976). Jackson received his PhD in 1982 with the thesis titled "The Anisotropy of the Hubble Constant".

From 1984 to 1999, he worked for Computer Sciences Corporation at the Space Telescope Science Institute in Baltimore, Maryland.
