= NGC 2939 =

Galaxy in the constellation Leo

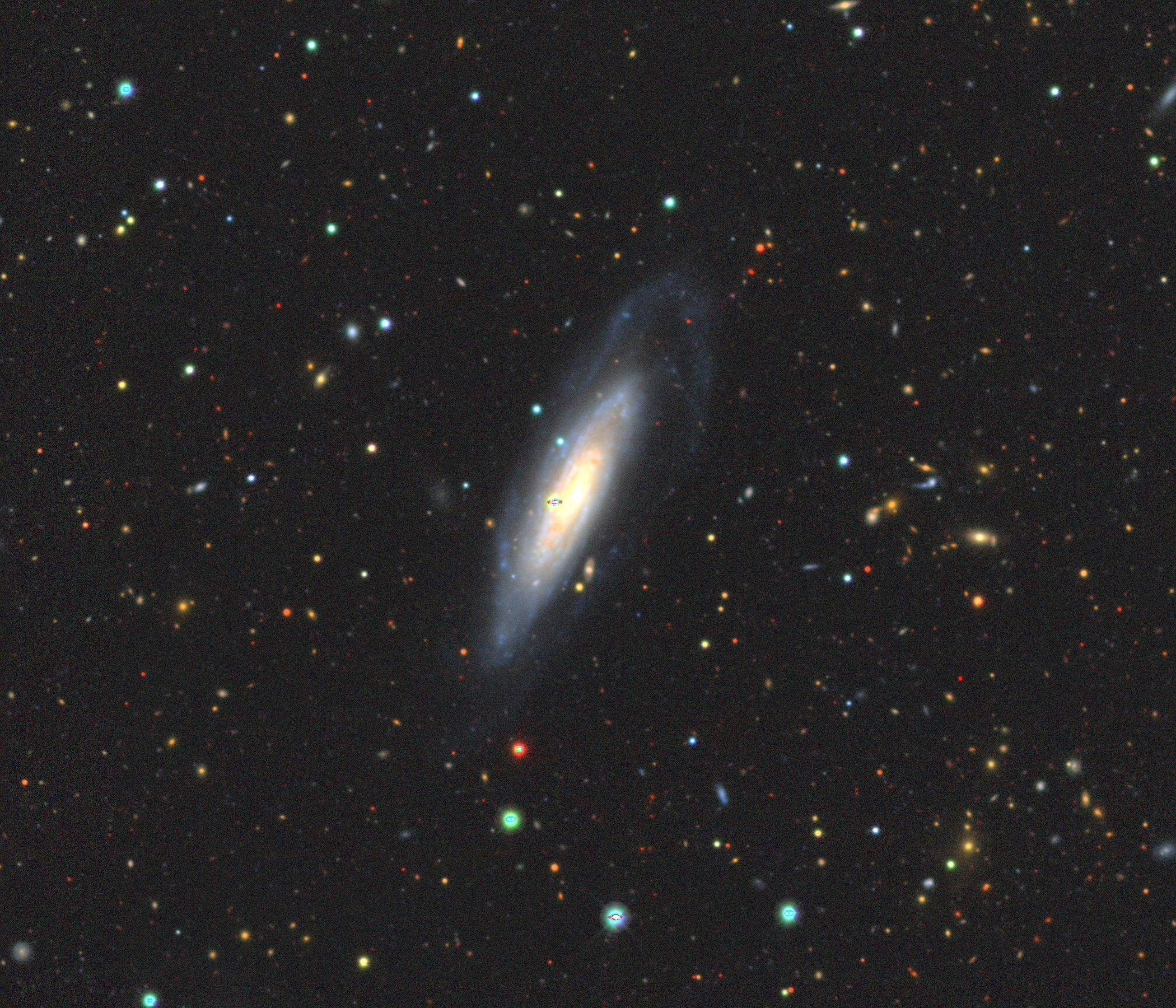
- NGC 2939 imaged by Legacy Surveys

Observation data (J2000 epoch)
- Constellation: Leo (constellation)
- Right ascension: 09^{h} 38^{m} 08.0700^{s}
- Declination: +09° 31′ 17.500″
- Redshift: 0.011138±0.00000500
- Heliocentric radial velocity: 3,339±1 km/s
- Distance: 149.30 ± 5.20 Mly (45.777 ± 1.594 Mpc)
- Group or cluster: NGC 2911 group (LGG 177)
- Apparent magnitude (V): 13.15

Characteristics
- Type: Sbc
- Size: ~112,900 ly (34.62 kpc) (estimated)
- Apparent size (V): 2.6′ × 0.7′

Other designations
- IRAS 09354+0945, 2MASX J09380786+0931258, UGC 5134, MCG +04-23-018, PGC 27451, CGCG 063-022

NGC 2939 is a spiral galaxy in the constellation of Leo. Its velocity with respect to the cosmic microwave background is 3,665±23 km/s, which corresponds to a Hubble distance of 176.3 ± 12.4 Mly (54.05 ± 3.80 Mpc). However, 13 non-redshift measurements give a closer mean distance of 149.30 ± 5.20 Mly (45.777 ± 1.594 Mpc). It was discovered by German-British astronomer William Herschel on 18 January 1784.

NGC 2939 is a radio galaxy, i.e. it has giant regions of radio emission extending well beyond its visible structure.

== NGC 2911 group ==
NGC 2939 is a member of the NGC 2911 group (also known as LGG 177). This group contains 7 galaxies, including NGC 2911, NGC 2913, NGC 2914, UGC 5189, UGC 5216, and PGC 27167.

== Supernovae ==
Two supernovae have been observed in NGC 2939:

- SN 2009ao (Type II-P, mag. 16.3) was discovered by The CHilean Automatic Supernova sEarch (CHASE) on 4 March 2009.
- SN 2011cf (Type II, mag. 18.2) was discovered by the Lick Observatory Supernova Search (LOSS) on 28 April 2011.

== See also ==
- List of NGC objects (2001–3000)
