= Sandra Faber =

American astrophysicist (born 1944)

Sandra M. Faber
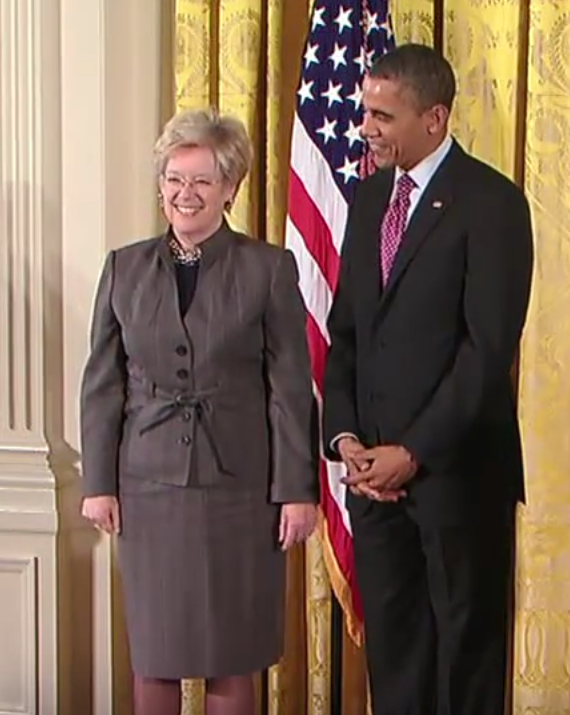
- Sandra Faber accepting the National Medal of Science from President Barack Obama in 2013
- Born: Sandra Moore; December 28, 1944 (age 81); Boston, Massachusetts, U.S.
- Education: Swarthmore College; Harvard University
- Known for: Faber–Jackson relation, Designing the Keck Observatory
- Awards: Dannie Heineman Prize for Astrophysics (1985); National Medal of Science (2011); Bruce Medal (2012); Gruber Prize in Cosmology (2017); Magellanic Premium (2018); Gold Medal of the Royal Astronomical Society (2020)
- Scientific career
- Fields: Astronomy
- Workplaces: University of California, Santa Cruz; Lick Observatory
- Thesis: Photometry of elliptical galaxies in multiple systems (1971)
- Doctoral advisor: I. John Danziger
- Doctoral students: Cristina Dalle Ore; Tod R. Lauer

Sandra Moore Faber (born December 28, 1944) is an American astrophysicist known for her research on the evolution of galaxies. She is the University Professor emerita of Astronomy and Astrophysics at the University of California, Santa Cruz, and works at the Lick Observatory. She has made discoveries linking the brightness of galaxies to the speed of stars within them and was the co-discoverer of the Faber–Jackson relation. Faber was also instrumental in designing the Keck telescopes in Hawaii.

== Early life and education ==
Faber studied at Swarthmore College, majoring in physics and minoring in mathematics and astronomy. She earned her bachelor's degree in 1966. She then earned her PhD in 1972 from Harvard University, specializing in Optical Observational Astronomy under the direction of I. John Danziger. During this time the only observatory open to her was the Kitt Peak National Observatory, which had inadequate technology for the complexity of her thesis.

== Personal life ==
Faber married Andrew Leigh Faber, a fellow Swarthmore physics major one year her junior, on June 9, 1967. They have two daughters, Robin and Holly.

== Career and research ==
In 1972, Faber joined the faculty of the Lick Observatory at University of California, Santa Cruz, becoming the first woman on staff. In 1976, Faber observed the relationship between the brightness and spectra of galaxies and the orbital speeds and motions of the stars within them. The law that resulted would become known as the Faber–Jackson relation, after herself and the co-author, graduate student Robert Jackson.

Three years later, Faber and collaborator John S. Gallagher published a paper collecting all of the evidence for the existence of dark matter that had been published at that point. In 1983, she published original research showing that dark matter was not composed of fast-moving neutrinos ("hot dark matter") and that instead, it was likely composed of slow-moving particles yet to be discovered ("cold dark matter").

Around 1984, Faber collaborated with Joel Primack, George R. Blumenthal, and Martin Rees to elucidate their theory of how dark matter was part of galaxy formation and evolution. This was the first proposal of how galaxies have formed and evolved from the Big Bang to today. While some details have been proven wrong, the paper still stands as the current working paradigm for structure information in the universe. She and her collaborators discovered high-speed galaxy flows.

In 1985, Faber was involved with the construction of the Keck Telescope and building the first wide-field planetary camera for the Hubble Space Telescope. UC Berkeley physicist Jerry Nelson designed the Keck telescope, but Faber helped to sell the idea of large optical telescopes all over the world. The Keck telescope is the second largest optical telescope in the world, with a 10-meter primary mirror of a novel type that consists of 36 hexagonal segments. Sandra Faber co-chaired the Science Steering Committee, which oversaw the first-light instrument for Keck I. She also continued to insist on high optical quality for the primary mirror of the Keck I, and went on to work on the Keck II as well.

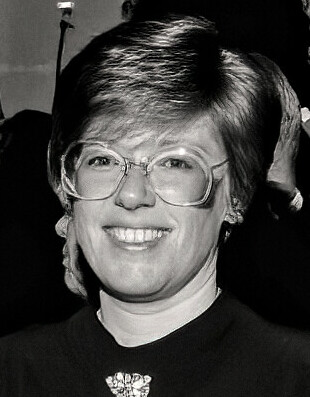
Faber in 1988

During the later 1980s, Faber got involved in an eight-year project called the "Seven Samurai" collaboration, which attempted to catalogue the size and orbital speeds of 400 galaxies. Though this goal was not met, the group developed a way to estimate the distance to any galaxy, which became one of the most reliable ways to measure the total density of the universe.

In 1990, she assisted with the on-orbit commissioning of the wide field planetary camera for the Hubble Space Telescope. She says this was one of the most exhilarating and well-known phases of her career. The optics of the Hubble were flawed, and Faber and her team helped to diagnose the cause as spherical aberration. In 1995, Faber was appointed University Professor at UCSC.

Faber was also the principal investigator of the Nuker Team, which used the Hubble Space Telescope to search for supermassive black holes at the centers of galaxies. One of her most recent works include the addition of a new optical spectrograph for the Keck II telescope, which saw its first light in 1996. The new addition would increase the Keck II's power for observing far-away galaxies by 13-fold.

At UCSC she focuses her research on the evolution of structure in the universe and the evolution and formation of galaxies. In addition to this, she led the development of the DEIMOS instrument on the Keck telescopes to obtain spectra of cosmologically distant galaxies. On August 1, 2012 she became the Interim Director of the University of California Observatories.

Sandra Faber was a co-editor of the Annual Review of Astronomy and Astrophysics with Ewine van Dishoeck from 2012 to 2021. She co-chairs the Board of Directors of Annual Reviews.

== Honors and awards ==
- 1977, Alfred P. Sloan Foundation Fellowship
- 1978, Bart J. Bok Prize, Harvard University
- 1985. elected to the National Academy of Sciences
- 1985, Dannie Heineman Prize for Astrophysics
- 1986, Honorary Degree, Swarthmore College
- 1989, elected member, American Academy of Arts and Sciences
- 1996-1997, Antoinette de Vaucouleurs Lectureship and Medal, University of Texas
- 1997, Honorary Degree, Williams College
- 2001, elected to the American Philosophical Society
- 2005, Medaille de l'Institute d'Astrophysique de Paris
- 2006, Harvard Centennial Medal
- 2006, Member, Harvard Board of Overseers
- 2006, Honorary Degree, University of Chicago
- 2009, Bower Award and Prize for Achievement in Science, Franklin Institute
- 2010, Honorary Degree, University of Pennsylvania
- 2011, Honorary Degree, University of Michigan
- 2011, Henry Norris Russell Lectureship, American Astronomical Society
- 2012, Bruce Medal, Astronomical Society of the Pacific
- 2012, Karl Schwarzschild Medal, German Astronomical Society
- 2012, National Medal of Science
- 2017, Gruber Prize in Cosmology
- 2018, Magellanic Premium Medal, American Philosophical Society
- 2020, Gold Medal of the Royal Astronomical Society
- 2020, Elected a Legacy Fellow of the American Astronomical Society
- Member, Board of Trustees of the Carnegie Institution for Science
- Minor planet #283277 Faber is named for her.

== See also ==
- Faber–Jackson relation
- Hubble Space Telescope
- Nuker Team
- List of women in leadership positions on astronomical instrumentation projects
