= 3C 285 =

Galaxy in constellation Canes Venatici

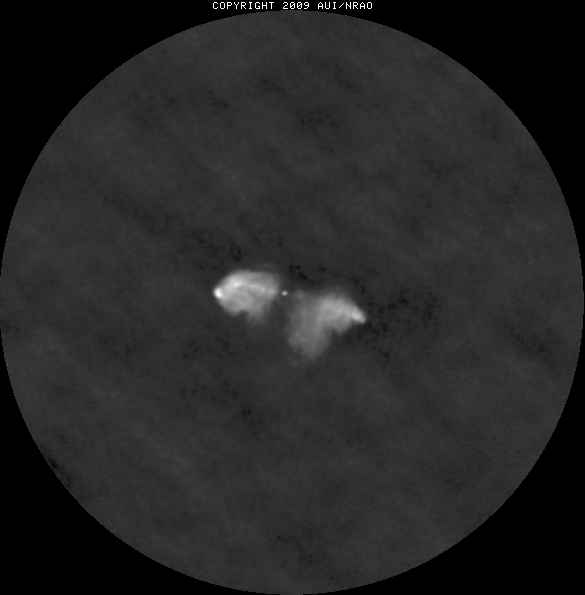
- 3C 285 in radiowaves

Observation data (J2000 epoch)
- Constellation: Canes Venatici
- Right ascension: 13^{h} 21^{m} 17.813^{s}
- Declination: +42° 35′ 15.38″
- Redshift: 0.0794
- Heliocentric radial velocity: 23,799 ± 5 km/s
- Distance: 323 megaparsecs (1.05×10^{9} ly) h^{−1}_{0.73}
- Apparent magnitude (V): 16.23

Characteristics
- Type: rG, Rad, AGN, G, GiG, QSO; G, FR II
- Apparent size (V): 0.417' x 0.242'

Other designations
- DA 343, LEDA 46625, 3C 285, 4C +42.37, 2MASX J13211781+4235153

3C 285 is a radio galaxy located in the constellation Canes Venatici. It is located about 1 billion light years away. It is a Fanaroff-Riley 2 radio galaxy and is hosted in a disturbed spiral galaxy.

3C 285 is the brightest member of a small galaxy group. Its morphology is peculiar, with an S-shaped envelope that points to another galaxy of the group, located to the northwest. A gas filament 26 arcseconds long extends towards that galaxy. In optical and ultraviolet observations the galaxy features dust lanes, two across the galaxy and one perpendicular to them that also obscures part of the nucleus. Along the edges of the dust lanes knots of elevated ultraviolet emission indicate locations of where new stars are formed. In the centre of 3C 285 lies a supermassive black hole whose mass is estimated to be 10^{7.70±0.10} (40-63 million) M_{☉} based on stellar velocity dispersion.

When observed in radiowaves, 3C 285 has two lobes with filamentary structures in them, and a jet is visible in the eastern lobe. A blue star forming region, named 3C 285/09.6, has been detected within the eastern radio lobe, and it has been suggested that the star formation was induced by the compression of a region of dense intergalactic gas by the radio jet. The gas mass of the region is estimated to be less than 6.2×10^{8} M_{☉} based on CO imaging and so it is estimated to be depleted if star formation continues at the current rate in less than a billion years.

== Gallery ==
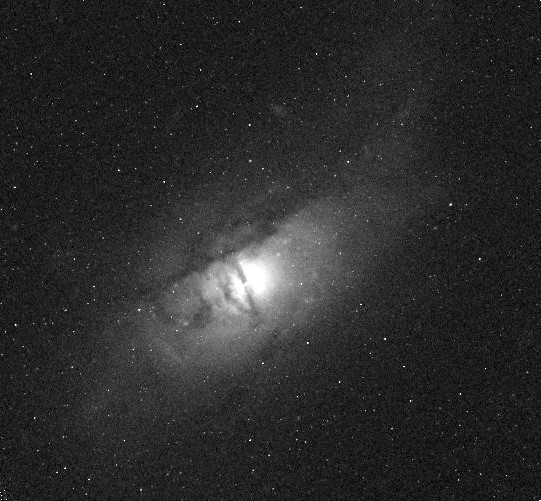
3C 285 by the Hubble Space Telescope

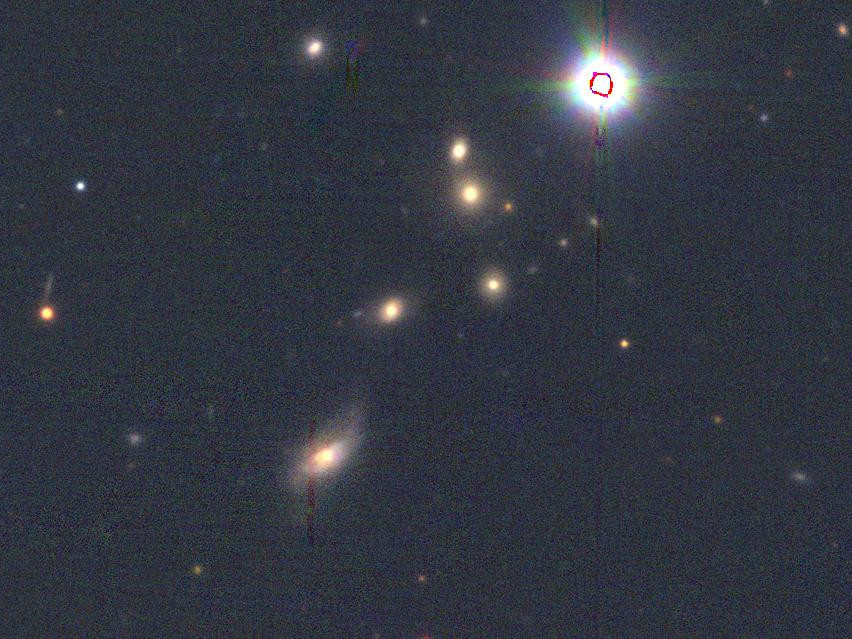
3C 285 with its galaxy group
