= Sołtan argument =

Theory about supermassive black holes

The Sołtan argument is an astrophysical theory outlined in 1982 by Polish astronomer Andrzej Sołtan. It maintains that if quasars were powered by accretion onto a supermassive black hole, then such supermassive black holes must exist in our local universe as "dead" quasars.

== History ==
As early as 1969, Donald Lynden-Bell wrote a paper suggesting that "dead quasars" were found at the center of the Milky Way and nearby galaxies by arguing that given the quasar-number counts, luminosities, distances, and the efficiency of accretion into a "Schwarzschild throat" through the last stable circular orbit (note that the term black hole had been coined only two years earlier and was still gaining popular usage), roughly 10^{10} quasars existed in the observable universe. This number density of "dead quasars" was attributed by Lynden-Bell to high mass-to-light ratio objects found at the center of galaxies. This is essentially the Sołtan argument, though the direct connection between black hole masses and quasar luminosity functions is missing. In the paper, Lynden-Bell also suggests some radical ideas that are now fully integrated into modern understanding of astrophysics including the model that accretion disks are supported by magnetic fields, that extragalactic cosmic rays are accelerated in them, and he estimates to within an order of magnitude the masses of several of the closest supermassive black holes including the ones in the Milky Way, M31, M32, M81, M82, M87, and NGC 4151.

Thirteen years later, Sołtan explicitly showed that the luminosity ($L$) of quasars was due to the accretion rate of mass onto black holes given by:

$L = \epsilon \dot{M} c^2$

where

- $\epsilon$ is the efficiency factor
- $\dot{M}$ is the time rate of mass falling into the black hole
- $c$ is the speed of light

Given the number of observed quasars at various redshifts, he was able to derive an integrated energy density due to quasar output. Since observers on Earth are flux limited, there are always more quasars that exist than are observed and thus the energy density he derived is a lower bound. He obtained the value of approximately 10^{−10} ergs per cubic meter.

Sołtan calculated the mass density of accreted material as it is directly related to the energy density of quasar light. He derived a value of approximately 10^{14} solar masses per cubic Gigaparsec. This mass would be discretely distributed (since quasars are single point sources); given an average mass of approximately ten million solar masses, it would be statistically likely for a "dead quasar" to be within a few megaparsecs of Earth.

At this time, evidence was already accumulating that supermassive black holes were found at the center of large galaxies, which are distributed approximately on the order of a megaparsec apart from each other. This argument therefore made a reasonable case that supermassive black holes were at one time ultraluminous quasars.

The first quantitative estimates of the mass density in supermassive black holes were 5-10 times higher than Sołtan's estimate. This discrepancy was resolved in 2000 via the discovery of the M–sigma relation, which showed that most of the previously published black hole masses were in error.

== Present constraints ==
As of 2008, the best constraints for the supermassive black hole mass per cubic megaparsec in the local universe derived from the Sołtan argument is between 2 - 5 × 10^{5} solar masses. This value is consistent with observations of the mass of local supermassive black holes.

== See also ==
- Supermassive black hole
- M–sigma relation
