= NGC 3658 =

Lenticular galaxy in Ursa Major

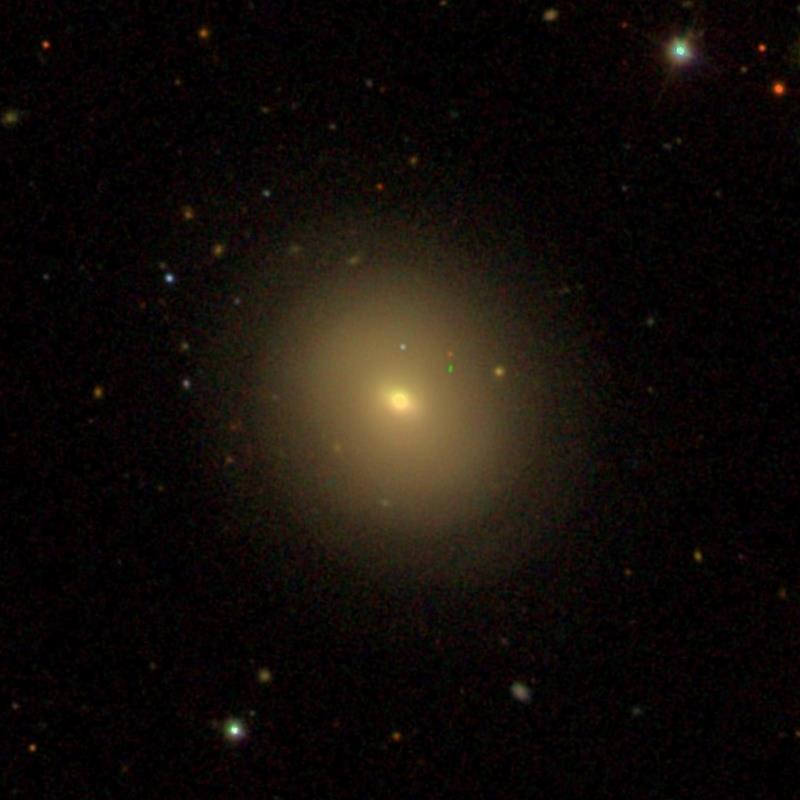
- NGC 3658 by the Sloan Digital Sky Survey

Observation data
- Constellation: Ursa Major
- Right ascension: 11^{h} 25^{m} 22^{s}
- Declination: +38° 25′ 09″

NGC 3658 is a lenticular galaxy located in the constellation Ursa Major. It was discovered on March 23, 1789 by the astronomer William Herschel.
