= Tully–Fisher relation =

Correlation between luminosity and emission line width of spiral galaxies

Intrinsic Luminosity versus Velocity Dispersion calibrated to the Virgo Cluster from the Local, M81 and M101 Groups. Data compiled from Tully & Fisher, 1977.

In astronomy, the Tully–Fisher relation (TFR) is an empirical relationship between the mass or intrinsic luminosity of a spiral galaxy and its asymptotic rotation velocity or emission line width. The line width of the 21cm hydrogen line is used to calculate the velocity dispersion of the galaxy's spiral arms. In general, the more luminous a spiral galaxy is, the faster the rotation of its disk. Since the observed brightness of a galaxy is distance-dependent, the relationship can be used to estimate distances to galaxies from measurements of their rotational velocity.

The TFR can be used to estimate the distance to spiral galaxies by allowing the luminosity of a galaxy to be derived from its directly measurable line width. The distance can then be found by comparing the luminosity to the apparent brightness. Thus the TFR constitutes a rung of the cosmic distance ladder, where it is calibrated using more direct distance measurement techniques and used in turn to calibrate methods extending to larger distance.

== Concept ==
The Tully-Fisher relation connects a relatively easy to measure distance-independent property, the width of the hydrogen emission line, to the total luminosity of a galaxy, a distance-dependent property. Well-studied galaxies with independently measured distances are used to calibrate the relationship, then line width measurements on new or very distant galaxies gives estimates of their distance. The relation is based on observational data alone, but theory suggests that a galaxy's mass determines both its rotational velocity and thus the dispersion of stellar velocities that broaden the line and determines the total luminosity at a given distance.

== History ==
The Tully–Fisher relation for spiral and lenticular galaxies showing an offset for galaxies of different typical colors.

The connection between rotational velocity measured spectroscopically and distance was first used in 1922 by Ernst Öpik to estimate the distance to the Andromeda Galaxy, establishing it as a separate galaxy for the first time. In the 1970s, Balkowski, C., et al. measured 13 galaxies but focused on using the data to distinguish galaxy shapes rather than extract distances. The Tully-Fisher relationship was first published in 1977 by astronomers R. Brent Tully and J. Richard Fisher. They calibrated the correlation between the hydrogen line profile width and absolute magnitude of spiral galaxies using the Local Group, the M81 Group and the M101 Group. The correlation was then used to derive distances to the Virgo Cluster and the Ursa Major Cluster. After visually adjusting both clusters to the calibrator groups on a graph, a distance modulus of apparent magnitude was calculated. From this method the empirical correlation between luminosity and the global profile parameter was stated in the form

$L \propto \Delta V(0)^\alpha$ where L is luminosity, V(0) is the global profile (rotational velocity), and alpha is the power law index that correlates to the slope of the relation.

The luminosity is calculated by multiplying the galaxy's apparent brightness by $4\pi d^2$, where $d$ is its distance from Earth, and the spectral-line width is measured using long-slit spectroscopy.

A series of collaborative catalogs of galaxy peculiar velocity values called CosmicFlow uses Tully–Fisher analysis; the Cosmicflow-4 catalog has reached 10000 galaxies. Many values of the Hubble constant have been derived from Tully–Fisher analysis, starting with the first paper and continuing through 2024.

== Subtypes ==
Baryonic Tully-Fisher relation. Data compiled from various sources.

Several different forms of the TFR exist, depending on which precise measures of mass, luminosity or rotation velocity one takes it to relate. Tully and Fisher used optical luminosity, but subsequent work showed the relation to be tighter when defined using microwave to infrared (K band) radiation (a good proxy for stellar mass), and even tighter when luminosity is replaced by the galaxy's total stellar mass. The relation in terms of stellar mass is dubbed the "stellar mass Tully Fisher relation" (STFR), and its scatter only shows correlations with the galaxy's kinematic morphology, such that more dispersion-supported systems scatter below the relation. The tightest correlation is recovered when considering the total baryonic mass (the sum of its mass in stars and gas). This latter form of the relation is known as the baryonic Tully–Fisher relation (BTFR), and states that baryonic mass is proportional to velocity to the power of roughly 3.5–4.

In the dark matter paradigm, a galaxy's rotation velocity (and hence line width) is primarily determined by the mass of the dark matter halo in which it lives, making the TFR a manifestation of the connection between visible and dark matter mass. In Modified Newtonian dynamics (MOND), the BTFR (with power-law index exactly 4) is a direct consequence of the gravitational force law effective at low acceleration.

The analogues of the TFR for non-rotationally-supported galaxies, such as ellipticals, are known as the Faber–Jackson relation and the fundamental plane.

== See also ==
- Distance modulus
- Standard candle
- Cosmic distance ladder
- Faber–Jackson relation
- Fundamental plane
- Dark matter
- Standard model of cosmology
- Modified Newtonian dynamics
- Freeman law
