= M–sigma relation =

Concept in astronomy

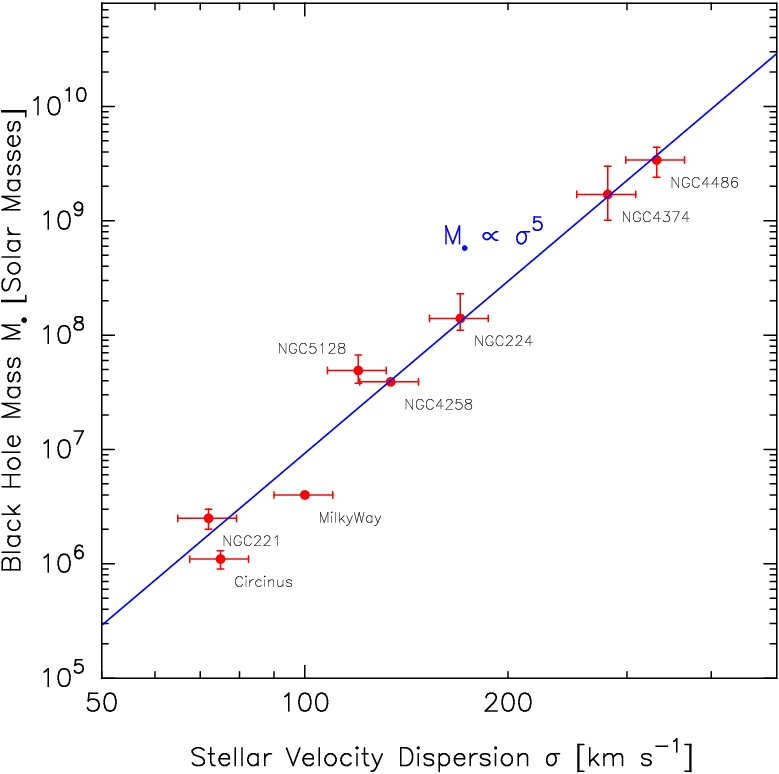
Black-hole mass plotted against velocity dispersion of stars in a galaxy bulge. Points are labelled by galaxy name; all points in this diagram are for galaxies that have a clear, Keplerian rise in velocity near the center, indicative of the presence of a central mass. The M–σ relation is shown in blue.

The M–sigma (or M–σ) relation is an empirical correlation between the stellar velocity dispersion σ of a galaxy bulge and the mass M of the supermassive black hole at its center.

The M–σ relation was first presented in 1999 during a conference at the Institut d'Astrophysique de Paris in France by David Merritt. Merritt's proposed form of the relation, which he called the "Faber–Jackson law for black holes", was

$$\frac{M}{10^8M_\odot} \approx 3.1\left(\frac{\sigma}{200~{\rm km}~{\rm s}^{-1}}\right)^4.$$

where $M_\odot$ is the solar mass. Publication of the relation in a refereed journal, by two groups, took place the following year. One of many recent studies, based on the growing sample of published black hole masses in nearby galaxies, gives

$$\frac{M}{10^8M_\odot} \approx 1.9\left(\frac{\sigma}{200~{\rm km}~{\rm s}^{-1}}\right)^{5.1}.$$

Earlier work demonstrated a relationship between galaxy luminosity and black hole mass, which nowadays has a comparable level of scatter. The M–σ relation is generally interpreted as implying some source of mechanical feedback between the growth of supermassive black holes and the growth of galaxy bulges, although the source of this feedback is still uncertain.

Discovery of the M–σ relation was taken by many astronomers to imply that supermassive black holes are fundamental components of galaxies. Prior to about 2000, the main concern had been the simple detection of black holes, while afterward the interest changed to understanding the role of supermassive black holes as a critical component of galaxies. This led to the main use of the relation to estimate black hole masses in galaxies that are too distant for direct mass measurements to be made, and to assay the overall black hole content of the Universe.

== Origin ==
The tightness of the M–σ relation suggests that some kind of feedback acts to maintain the connection between black hole mass and stellar velocity dispersion, in spite of processes like galaxy mergers and gas accretion that might be expected to increase the scatter over time. One such mechanism was suggested by Joseph Silk and Martin Rees in 1998. These authors proposed a model in which supermassive black holes first form via collapse of giant gas clouds before most of the bulge mass has turned into stars. The black holes created in this way would then accrete and radiate, driving a wind which acts back on the accretion flow. The flow would stall if the rate of deposition of mechanical energy into the infalling gas was large enough to unbind the protogalaxy in one crossing time. The Silk and Rees model predicts a slope for the M–σ relation of α = 5, which is approximately correct. However, the predicted normalization of the relation is too small by about a factor of one thousand. The reason is that there is far more energy released in the formation of a supermassive black hole than is needed to completely unbind the stellar bulge.

A more successful feedback model was first presented by Andrew King at the University of Leicester in 2003. In King's model, feedback occurs through momentum transfer, rather than energy transfer as in the case of Silk & Rees's model. A "momentum-driven flow" is one in which the gas cooling time is so short that essentially all the energy in the flow is in the form of bulk motion. In such a flow, most of the energy released by the black hole is lost to radiation, and only a few percent is left to affect the gas mechanically. King's model predicts a slope of α = 4 for the M–σ relation, and the normalization is exactly correct; it is roughly a factor c/σ ≈ 10^{3} times larger than in Silk & Rees's relation.

Hydrodynamic simulations have shown that the M–σ relation can emerge naturally from complex, multiphase outflows driven by active galactic nucleus (AGN) feedback; these models indicate that interactions between different gas phases and momentum-driven feedback regulate the cold gas and black hole growth of the host galaxy, even in turbulent environments without ideal assumptions.

== Importance ==
Before the M–σ relation was discovered in 2000, a large discrepancy existed between black hole masses derived using three techniques. Direct, or dynamical, measurements based on the motion of stars or gas near the black hole seemed to give masses that averaged ≈1% of the bulge mass (the "Magorrian relation"). Two other techniques—reverberation mapping in active galactic nuclei, and the Sołtan argument, which computes the cosmological density in black holes needed to explain the quasar light—both gave a mean value of M/M_{bulge} that was a factor ≈10 smaller than implied by the Magorrian relation. The M–σ relation resolved this discrepancy by showing that most of the direct black hole masses published prior to 2000 were significantly in error, presumably because the data on which they were based were of insufficient quality to resolve the black hole's dynamical sphere of influence. The mean ratio of black hole mass to bulge mass in big early-type galaxies is now believed to be approximately 1 : 200, and increasingly smaller as one moves to less massive galaxies.

A common use of the M–σ relation is to estimate black hole masses in distant galaxies using the easily measured quantity σ. Black hole masses in thousands of galaxies have been estimated in this way. The M–σ relation is also used to calibrate so-called secondary and tertiary mass estimators, which relate the black hole mass to the strength of emission lines from hot gas in the nucleus or to the velocity dispersion of gas in the bulge.

The tightness of the M–σ relation has led to suggestions that every bulge must contain a supermassive black hole. However, the number of galaxies in which the effect of the black hole's gravity on the motion of stars or gas is unambiguously seen is still quite small. It is unclear whether the lack of black hole detections in many galaxies implies that these galaxies do not contain black holes; or that their masses are significantly below the value implied by the M–σ relation; or that the data are simply too poor to reveal the presence of the black hole.

The smallest supermassive black hole with a well-determined mass has M_{bh} ≈ 10^{6} M_{☉}. The existence of black holes in the mass range 10^{2}–10^{5} M_{☉} ("intermediate-mass black holes") is predicted by the M–σ relation in low-mass galaxies, and the existence of intermediate-mass black holes has been reasonably well established in a number of galaxies that contain active galactic nuclei, although the values of M_{bh} in these galaxies are very uncertain. No clear evidence has been found for ultra-massive black holes with masses above 10^{10} M_{☉}, although this may be an expected consequence of the observed upper limit to σ.

Recent studies of AGNs indicate that the M–σ relation in systems that are accreting today may differ systematically from those observed in quiescent galaxies. Observations of local type 1 AGNs and quasars have shown that these systems can exhibit larger intrinsic scatter in data and possible offsets in normalization relative to the relation defined by inactive galaxies, pointing to additional complexities in black hole mass estimation during active phases.

Differences between jetted and non-jetted AGNs may also affect the M–σ relation; in particular, galaxies with relativistic jets may follow somewhat different trends and lie on distinct evolutionary paths than those without jets, possibly due to differences in feedback processes and black hole properties.

The extent to which stellar velocity dispersion is the fundamental parameter governing black hole mass remains an active area of research. Multiple analyses of scaling relation residuals have reinforced the dominant role of stellar velocity dispersion, while they also explore whether spheroidal mass or dark matter halo mass may contribute at a secondary level.

Assumptions about the form and universality of the M–σ relation can affect estimates of the cosmic supermassive black hole mass function. Different choices of scaling relation can lead to large differences in inferred black hole mass densities, calling attention to the importance of accurately determining these relations for studies of black hole populations and cosmic evolution.

== See also ==
- Faber–Jackson relation
- Galaxy formation and evolution
- Sigma-D relation
