= Velocity dispersion =

Statistical dispersion

In astronomy, the velocity dispersion (σ) is the statistical dispersion of velocities about the mean velocity for a group of astronomical objects, such as an open cluster, globular cluster, galaxy, galaxy cluster, or supercluster. By measuring the radial velocities of the group's members through astronomical spectroscopy, the velocity dispersion of that group can be estimated and used to derive the group's mass from the virial theorem. Radial velocity is found by measuring the Doppler width of spectral lines of a collection of objects; the more radial velocities one measures, the more accurately one knows their dispersion. A central velocity dispersion refers to the σ of the interior regions of an extended object, such as a galaxy or cluster.

The relationship between velocity dispersion and matter (or the observed electromagnetic radiation emitted by this matter) takes several forms – specific correlations – in astronomy based on the object(s) being observed. Notably, the M–σ relation applies for material orbiting many black holes, the Faber–Jackson relation for elliptical galaxies, and the Tully–Fisher relation for spiral galaxies. For example, the σ found for objects about the Milky Way's supermassive black hole (SMBH) is about 100 km/s, which provides an approximation of the mass of this SMBH. The Andromeda Galaxy (Messier 31) hosts a SMBH about 10 times larger than our own, and has a σ ≈ 160 km/s.

Groups and clusters of galaxies have more disparate (contrasting in degree) velocity dispersions than smaller objects. For example, while our own poor group, the Local Group, has a σ = 61±8 km/s, rich clusters of galaxies, such as the Coma Cluster, have a σ ≈ 1,000 km/s. The dwarf elliptical galaxies within Coma, as with all galaxies, have their own internal velocity dispersion for their stars, which is a σ ≲ 80 km/s, typically. Normal elliptical galaxies, by comparison, have an average σ ≈ 200 km/s.

For spiral galaxies, the increase in velocity dispersion in population I stars is a gradual process which likely results from the near-random incidence of momentum exchanges, specifically dynamical friction, between individual stars and large interstellar media (gas and dust clouds) with masses greater than 10^{5} M_{☉}. Face-on spiral galaxies have a central σ ≲ 90 km/s; slightly more if viewed edge-on.

== See also ==
- M–σ relation – for material circling supermassive black holes
- Faber–Jackson relation – for elliptical galaxies
- Tully–Fisher relation – for spiral galaxies
