= NGC 3768 =

Galaxy in Leo constellation

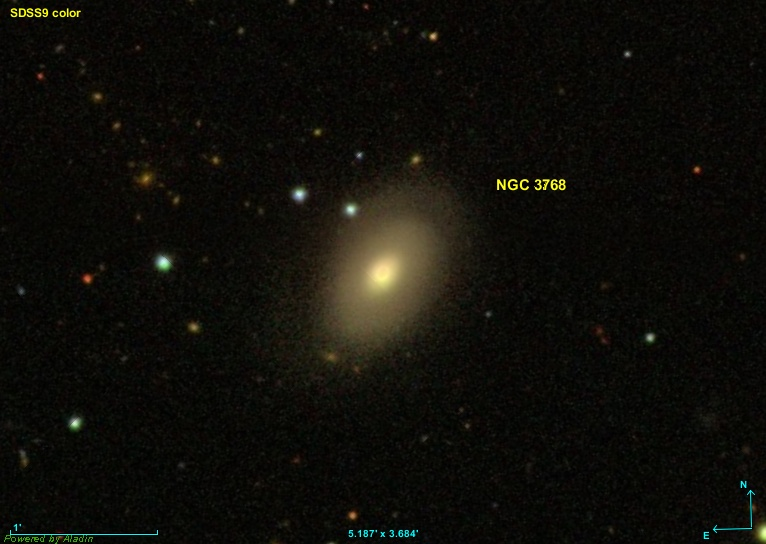
- Image of NGC 3768

Observation data (J2000 epoch)
- Constellation: Leo
- Right ascension: 11^{h} 37^{m} 14.4664^{s}
- Declination: +17° 50′ 23.589″
- Redshift: 0.011585 ± 0.0000063
- Heliocentric radial velocity: 3473 ± 19 km/s
- Galactocentric velocity: 3413 ± 19 km/s
- Distance: 183.2 ± 12.9 Mly (56.16 ± 3.97 Mpc)
- Apparent magnitude (V): 13.7

Characteristics
- Type: S0
- Size: ~356,200 ly (109.20 kpc) (estimated)

Other designations
- 2MASX J11371444+1750241, UGC 6589, LEDA 35968, PGC 35968

NGC 3768 (also known as UGC 6589) is a lenticular galaxy in the constellation Leo. It was discovered on March 14, 1784 by William Herschel.

== See also ==
- List of NGC objects (3001-4000)
- List of NGC objects
