= NGC 3790 =

Galaxy in Leo constellation

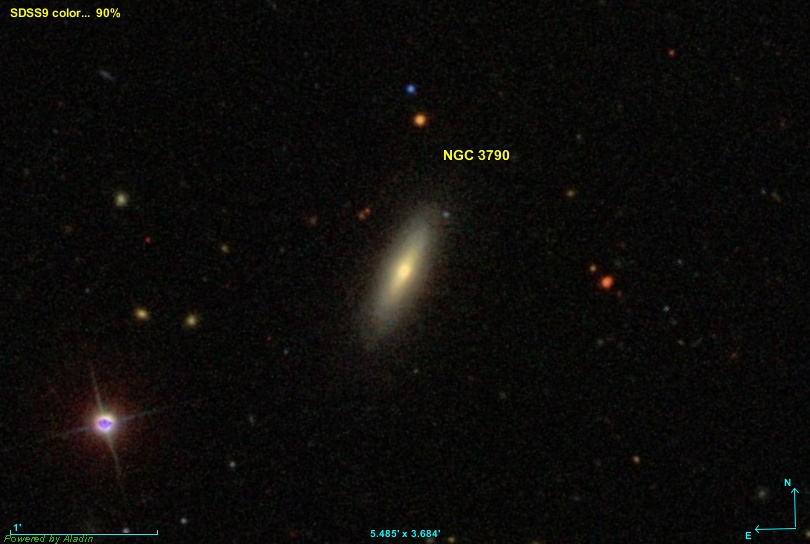
- Image of NGC 3790

Observation data (J2000 epoch)
- Constellation: Leo
- Right ascension: 11^{h} 39^{m} 47.2541^{s}
- Declination: +17° 42′ 44.138″
- Redshift: 0.011270 ± 0.000000693
- Heliocentric radial velocity: 3379 ± 2 km/s
- Galactocentric velocity: 3319 ± 3 km/s
- Distance: 178.6 ± 12.6 Mly (54.77 ± 3.85 Mpc)
- Apparent magnitude (V): 14.5

Characteristics
- Type: S0/a
- Size: ~73,500 ly (22.53 kpc) (estimated)

Other designations
- 2MASX J11394722+1742438, UGC 6624, LEDA 36167, PGC 36167

NGC 3790 (also known as UGC 6624) is a lenticular galaxy in the constellation Leo. It was Discovered April 17, 1784 by William Herschel.

== See also ==
- List of NGC objects (3001-4000)
- List of NGC objects
