= Nalin Samarasinha =

Sri Lankan born planetary scientist

Dr Nalin Samarasinha
- Born: 1958 (age 67–68); Sri Lanka
- Education: Hena Vidyalaya, Mt. Lavinia; Nalanda College, Colombo; University of Colombo; University of Maryland, College Park USA
- Occupation: Astronomer
- Employer: Planetary Science Institute USA
- Known for: first native born citizen of Sri Lanka to gain the distinction of having an Asteroid named after him
- Title: Senior Scientist

Nalin H. Samarasinha (born 1958) is a Sri Lankan born planetary scientist and a discoverer of minor planets, who studies the dynamical evolution and processes of cometary nuclei and comae. Currently, he works as a senior scientist for the Planetary Science Institute in the United States.

== Early life ==
Samarasinha earned a BSc first class honours in Physics from University of Colombo after schooling at Hena Vidyalaya, Mt. Lavinia and Nalanda College Colombo. Later he gained a MSc in astronomy from University of Maryland, College Park USA and followed it up furthering studies graduating with a PhD in Astronomy from the University of Maryland.

== Discoveries and honours ==
Florian asteroid 12871 Samarasinha (1998 ML_{37}), discovered by astronomers with the LONEOS survey in 1998, was named in his honor. The official naming citation was published by IAU's Minor Planet Center on 24 July 2002 (M.P.C. 46109). He is the first native born citizen of Sri Lanka to gain the distinction of having an asteroid named after him. Together with astronomer Tod R. Lauer, he is credited with the discovery of asteroid 607372 Colombounilanka.
