= List of minor planets: 607001–608000 =

The following is a partial list of minor planets, running from minor-planet number 607001 through 608000, inclusive. The primary data for this and other partial lists is based on JPL's "Small-Body Orbital Elements" and data available from the Minor Planet Center. Critical list information is also provided by the MPC, unless otherwise specified from Lowell Observatory. A detailed description of the table's columns and additional sources are given on the main page including a complete list of every page in this series, and a statistical break-up on the dynamical classification of minor planets.

Also see the summary list of all named bodies in numerical and alphabetical order, and the corresponding naming citations for the number range of this particular list. New namings may only be added to this list after official publication, as the preannouncement of names is condemned by the Working Group for Small Bodies Nomenclature of the International Astronomical Union.

Near-Earth obj.	MBA (inner)	MBA (outer)	Centaur
Mars-crosser	MBA (middle)	Jupiter trojan	Trans-Neptunian obj.
Unclassified

== 607001–607100 ==
Designation			Discovery			Properties		Ref
Permanent	Provisional	Named after	Date	Site	Discoverer(s)	Category	Diam.	Ref
607001	2020 YE_{15}	—	October 8, 2007	Mount Lemmon	Mount Lemmon Survey	(5)	830 m	MPC · JPL
607002	2021 AJ_{13}	—	December 18, 2004	Mount Lemmon	Mount Lemmon Survey	·	510 m	MPC · JPL
607003	2021 BW_{5}	—	August 7, 2018	Haleakala	Pan-STARRS 1	·	1.6 km	MPC · JPL
607004	2021 CQ_{23}	—	January 15, 2015	Haleakala	Pan-STARRS 1	VER	2.2 km	MPC · JPL
607005	2021 EL_{11}	—	January 15, 2015	Mount Lemmon	Mount Lemmon Survey	·	2.0 km	MPC · JPL
607006	2021 EZ_{16}	—	January 25, 2007	Kitt Peak	Spacewatch	·	540 m	MPC · JPL
607007	2021 FK_{13}	—	December 29, 2011	Mount Lemmon	Mount Lemmon Survey	MAR	830 m	MPC · JPL
607008	2021 FJ_{25}	—	October 8, 2008	Mount Lemmon	Mount Lemmon Survey	·	1.9 km	MPC · JPL
607009	2021 OX_{18}	—	August 30, 2005	Kitt Peak	Spacewatch	·	2.1 km	MPC · JPL
607010	2021 PP_{85}	—	May 2, 2014	Mount Lemmon	Mount Lemmon Survey	·	2.7 km	MPC · JPL
607011	2021 QQ_{20}	—	March 31, 2008	Mount Lemmon	Mount Lemmon Survey	EOS	1.4 km	MPC · JPL
607012	1991 TD_{17}	—	September 25, 2012	Mount Lemmon	Mount Lemmon Survey	·	1.4 km	MPC · JPL
607013	1993 BM_{10}	—	January 22, 1993	Kitt Peak	Spacewatch	·	1.6 km	MPC · JPL
607014	1993 RG_{21}	—	October 17, 2006	Mount Lemmon	Mount Lemmon Survey	·	3.8 km	MPC · JPL
607015	1994 BX_{2}	—	January 19, 1994	Kitt Peak	Spacewatch	·	790 m	MPC · JPL
607016	1994 GV_{5}	—	April 6, 1994	Kitt Peak	Spacewatch	V	590 m	MPC · JPL
607017	1994 RC_{30}	—	September 5, 1994	Kitt Peak	Spacewatch	·	1.6 km	MPC · JPL
607018	1994 ST_{5}	—	September 28, 1994	Kitt Peak	Spacewatch	TEL	960 m	MPC · JPL
607019	1994 UP_{3}	—	October 26, 1994	Kitt Peak	Spacewatch	EOS	1.6 km	MPC · JPL
607020	1994 UX_{8}	—	October 28, 1994	Kitt Peak	Spacewatch	·	660 m	MPC · JPL
607021	1994 WY_{6}	—	November 28, 1994	Kitt Peak	Spacewatch	WIT	970 m	MPC · JPL
607022	1994 XT_{2}	—	December 1, 1994	Kitt Peak	Spacewatch	MRX	1.1 km	MPC · JPL
607023	1995 CV_{6}	—	February 1, 1995	Kitt Peak	Spacewatch	·	1.2 km	MPC · JPL
607024	1995 EZ_{2}	—	March 1, 1995	Kitt Peak	Spacewatch	·	1.8 km	MPC · JPL
607025	1995 FB_{9}	—	March 26, 1995	Kitt Peak	Spacewatch	·	640 m	MPC · JPL
607026	1995 MH_{8}	—	June 29, 1995	Kitt Peak	Spacewatch	EUN	840 m	MPC · JPL
607027	1995 OP_{13}	—	July 22, 1995	Kitt Peak	Spacewatch	·	1.5 km	MPC · JPL
607028	1995 QH_{17}	—	September 5, 2008	Kitt Peak	Spacewatch	·	1.5 km	MPC · JPL
607029	1995 SO_{58}	—	September 23, 1995	Kitt Peak	Spacewatch	·	2.2 km	MPC · JPL
607030	1995 SA_{70}	—	September 19, 1995	Kitt Peak	Spacewatch	·	2.8 km	MPC · JPL
607031	1995 SQ_{80}	—	September 30, 1995	Kitt Peak	Spacewatch	·	1.4 km	MPC · JPL
607032	1995 SW_{82}	—	September 24, 1995	Kitt Peak	Spacewatch	·	1.3 km	MPC · JPL
607033	1995 SM_{90}	—	September 17, 1995	Kitt Peak	Spacewatch	·	890 m	MPC · JPL
607034	1995 UZ_{31}	—	October 21, 1995	Kitt Peak	Spacewatch	·	840 m	MPC · JPL
607035	1995 UK_{42}	—	October 24, 1995	Kitt Peak	Spacewatch	·	1.1 km	MPC · JPL
607036	1995 UN_{43}	—	October 24, 1995	Kitt Peak	Spacewatch	·	1.5 km	MPC · JPL
607037	1995 UJ_{66}	—	October 17, 1995	Kitt Peak	Spacewatch	·	1.1 km	MPC · JPL
607038	1995 UZ_{74}	—	October 21, 1995	Kitt Peak	Spacewatch	·	1.1 km	MPC · JPL
607039	1995 UH_{76}	—	October 21, 1995	Kitt Peak	Spacewatch	·	1.1 km	MPC · JPL
607040	1995 UN_{79}	—	October 24, 1995	Kitt Peak	Spacewatch	·	1.8 km	MPC · JPL
607041	1995 UW_{79}	—	October 24, 1995	Kitt Peak	Spacewatch	MAS	540 m	MPC · JPL
607042	1995 WZ_{32}	—	November 20, 1995	Kitt Peak	Spacewatch	·	1.2 km	MPC · JPL
607043	1996 AF_{9}	—	January 13, 1996	Kitt Peak	Spacewatch	·	1.8 km	MPC · JPL
607044	1996 BM_{9}	—	January 21, 1996	Kitt Peak	Spacewatch	·	1.5 km	MPC · JPL
607045	1996 BU_{10}	—	January 15, 1996	Kitt Peak	Spacewatch	·	1.1 km	MPC · JPL
607046	1996 BH_{16}	—	January 21, 1996	Kitt Peak	Spacewatch	·	2.8 km	MPC · JPL
607047	1996 EV_{5}	—	March 11, 1996	Kitt Peak	Spacewatch	·	1.4 km	MPC · JPL
607048	1996 FG_{25}	—	February 17, 2013	Kitt Peak	Spacewatch	·	2.9 km	MPC · JPL
607049	1996 GX_{13}	—	April 12, 1996	Kitt Peak	Spacewatch	EUN	1.3 km	MPC · JPL
607050	1996 RQ_{23}	—	September 15, 1996	Kitt Peak	Spacewatch	·	980 m	MPC · JPL
607051	1996 VY_{34}	—	November 8, 1996	Kitt Peak	Spacewatch	(5)	900 m	MPC · JPL
607052	1996 XA_{10}	—	December 1, 1996	Kitt Peak	Spacewatch	·	2.1 km	MPC · JPL
607053	1996 XE_{20}	—	December 4, 1996	Kitt Peak	Spacewatch	V	520 m	MPC · JPL
607054	1996 XY_{37}	—	January 3, 2014	Kitt Peak	Spacewatch	·	1.0 km	MPC · JPL
607055	1997 BH_{5}	—	January 31, 1997	Kitt Peak	Spacewatch	·	1.4 km	MPC · JPL
607056	1997 CB_{14}	—	February 3, 1997	Kitt Peak	Spacewatch	·	880 m	MPC · JPL
607057	1997 EV_{16}	—	March 7, 1997	Kitt Peak	Spacewatch	H	470 m	MPC · JPL
607058	1997 EJ_{20}	—	March 4, 1997	Kitt Peak	Spacewatch	RAF	950 m	MPC · JPL
607059	1997 EV_{21}	—	March 4, 1997	Kitt Peak	Spacewatch	·	1.2 km	MPC · JPL
607060	1997 EE_{22}	—	March 5, 1997	Kitt Peak	Spacewatch	EUN	1.0 km	MPC · JPL
607061	1997 NT_{2}	—	July 2, 1997	Kitt Peak	Spacewatch	·	2.3 km	MPC · JPL
607062	1997 OK_{3}	—	January 26, 2011	Mount Lemmon	Mount Lemmon Survey	·	2.3 km	MPC · JPL
607063	1997 SX_{7}	—	September 23, 1997	Kitt Peak	Spacewatch	HOF	2.4 km	MPC · JPL
607064	1997 SK_{22}	—	September 28, 1997	Kitt Peak	Spacewatch	·	2.4 km	MPC · JPL
607065	1997 SO_{22}	—	September 29, 1997	Kitt Peak	Spacewatch	·	1.4 km	MPC · JPL
607066	1997 SP_{22}	—	September 29, 1997	Kitt Peak	Spacewatch	·	1.5 km	MPC · JPL
607067	1997 SE_{24}	—	September 30, 1997	Kitt Peak	Spacewatch	·	2.9 km	MPC · JPL
607068	1997 SP_{26}	—	September 28, 1997	Kitt Peak	Spacewatch	·	2.9 km	MPC · JPL
607069	1997 SW_{35}	—	March 28, 2001	Kitt Peak	Spacewatch	·	4.1 km	MPC · JPL
607070	1997 SY_{35}	—	January 17, 2013	Haleakala	Pan-STARRS 1	·	1.8 km	MPC · JPL
607071	1997 TG	—	October 1, 1997	Mauna Kea	C. Veillet, R. Shanks	·	990 m	MPC · JPL
607072	1997 TH_{8}	—	October 3, 1997	Kitt Peak	Spacewatch	·	790 m	MPC · JPL
607073	1997 TU_{8}	—	October 2, 1997	Mauna Kea	Shanks, R., Veillet, C.	·	540 m	MPC · JPL
607074	1997 TJ_{12}	—	October 2, 1997	Kitt Peak	Spacewatch	·	3.2 km	MPC · JPL
607075	1997 UQ_{15}	—	October 21, 1997	Kitt Peak	Spacewatch	·	1.1 km	MPC · JPL
607076	1998 BF_{24}	—	January 26, 1998	Kitt Peak	Spacewatch	·	710 m	MPC · JPL
607077	1998 BO_{31}	—	January 26, 1998	Kitt Peak	Spacewatch	THM	2.2 km	MPC · JPL
607078	1998 BZ_{38}	—	January 29, 1998	Kitt Peak	Spacewatch	·	580 m	MPC · JPL
607079	1998 DW_{38}	—	February 21, 1998	Kitt Peak	Spacewatch	·	650 m	MPC · JPL
607080	1998 FS_{149}	—	March 13, 2010	Pla D'Arguines	R. Ferrando, Ferrando, M.	EUN	950 m	MPC · JPL
607081	1998 GG_{13}	—	April 22, 2009	Mount Lemmon	Mount Lemmon Survey	MAS	480 m	MPC · JPL
607082	1998 HT_{2}	—	April 20, 1998	Kitt Peak	Spacewatch	·	1.3 km	MPC · JPL
607083	1998 HX_{9}	—	April 19, 1998	Kitt Peak	Spacewatch	·	1.5 km	MPC · JPL
607084	1998 HL_{25}	—	April 18, 1998	Kitt Peak	Spacewatch	·	1.4 km	MPC · JPL
607085	1998 KA_{1}	—	May 16, 1998	Kitt Peak	Spacewatch	·	1.1 km	MPC · JPL
607086	1998 OP_{1}	—	July 18, 1998	Bergisch Gladbach	W. Bickel	·	1.5 km	MPC · JPL
607087	1998 QC_{112}	—	April 8, 2006	Kitt Peak	Spacewatch	·	1.5 km	MPC · JPL
607088	1998 QG_{112}	—	August 31, 1998	Kitt Peak	Spacewatch	·	1.5 km	MPC · JPL
607089	1998 QH_{112}	—	September 29, 2011	Piszkéstető	K. Sárneczky	·	560 m	MPC · JPL
607090	1998 RU_{14}	—	September 14, 1998	Kitt Peak	Spacewatch	HNS	1.1 km	MPC · JPL
607091	1998 SH_{17}	—	September 17, 1998	Kitt Peak	Spacewatch	·	2.6 km	MPC · JPL
607092	1998 SM_{32}	—	September 23, 1998	Kitt Peak	Spacewatch	·	2.2 km	MPC · JPL
607093	1998 SR_{32}	—	September 20, 1998	Kitt Peak	Spacewatch	EOS	1.6 km	MPC · JPL
607094	1998 SO_{40}	—	September 24, 1998	Kitt Peak	Spacewatch	·	470 m	MPC · JPL
607095	1998 SA_{177}	—	September 28, 1998	Kitt Peak	Spacewatch	PAD	1.3 km	MPC · JPL
607096	1998 SR_{177}	—	May 15, 2005	Mount Lemmon	Mount Lemmon Survey	·	1.2 km	MPC · JPL
607097	1998 SV_{177}	—	June 5, 2014	Haleakala	Pan-STARRS 1	·	430 m	MPC · JPL
607098	1998 SW_{177}	—	July 27, 2011	Haleakala	Pan-STARRS 1	NEM	2.0 km	MPC · JPL
607099	1998 SK_{178}	—	April 20, 2014	Kitt Peak	Spacewatch	WIT	890 m	MPC · JPL
607100	1998 SO_{178}	—	July 31, 2014	Haleakala	Pan-STARRS 1	·	2.9 km	MPC · JPL

== 607101–607200 ==
back to top

Designation			Discovery			Properties		Ref
Permanent	Provisional	Named after	Date	Site	Discoverer(s)	Category	Diam.	Ref
607101	1998 SX_{178}	—	April 1, 2012	Haleakala	Pan-STARRS 1	·	3.1 km	MPC · JPL
607102	1998 SY_{178}	—	October 16, 2009	Mount Lemmon	Mount Lemmon Survey	EOS	1.4 km	MPC · JPL
607103	1998 SC_{179}	—	July 4, 2014	Haleakala	Pan-STARRS 1	·	2.3 km	MPC · JPL
607104	1998 SJ_{179}	—	October 21, 2016	Mount Lemmon	Mount Lemmon Survey	·	1.6 km	MPC · JPL
607105	1998 SN_{179}	—	September 19, 1998	Apache Point	SDSS	·	1.4 km	MPC · JPL
607106	1998 SU_{179}	—	October 23, 2011	Mount Lemmon	Mount Lemmon Survey	·	590 m	MPC · JPL
607107	1998 SO_{180}	—	October 20, 2008	Kitt Peak	Spacewatch	·	470 m	MPC · JPL
607108	1998 SC_{181}	—	May 14, 2005	Mount Lemmon	Mount Lemmon Survey	·	780 m	MPC · JPL
607109	1998 SF_{181}	—	September 19, 1998	Apache Point	SDSS Collaboration	·	1.6 km	MPC · JPL
607110	1998 SJ_{181}	—	September 23, 1998	Kitt Peak	Spacewatch	·	1.4 km	MPC · JPL
607111	1998 TA_{4}	—	October 1, 1998	Kitt Peak	Spacewatch	·	1.1 km	MPC · JPL
607112	1998 TB_{5}	—	October 14, 1998	Kitt Peak	Spacewatch	·	710 m	MPC · JPL
607113	1998 TL_{21}	—	October 13, 1998	Kitt Peak	Spacewatch	MAS	560 m	MPC · JPL
607114	1998 TP_{24}	—	October 14, 1998	Kitt Peak	Spacewatch	THM	2.2 km	MPC · JPL
607115	1998 TT_{25}	—	October 14, 1998	Kitt Peak	Spacewatch	MAS	690 m	MPC · JPL
607116	1998 VO_{39}	—	November 14, 1998	Kitt Peak	Spacewatch	·	2.3 km	MPC · JPL
607117	1998 WA_{38}	—	November 15, 1998	Kitt Peak	Spacewatch	MAS	650 m	MPC · JPL
607118	1998 WN_{46}	—	October 21, 2007	Kitt Peak	Spacewatch	·	1.5 km	MPC · JPL
607119	1999 AB_{35}	—	January 13, 1999	Mauna Kea	C. Veillet, J. Anderson	·	1.7 km	MPC · JPL
607120	1999 AU_{35}	—	January 12, 1999	Mauna Kea	C. Veillet, J. Anderson	·	1.6 km	MPC · JPL
607121	1999 AV_{39}	—	March 10, 2007	Kitt Peak	Spacewatch	·	980 m	MPC · JPL
607122	1999 BQ_{35}	—	January 25, 2003	Kitt Peak	Spacewatch	·	1.0 km	MPC · JPL
607123	1999 CP_{138}	—	February 7, 1999	Kitt Peak	Spacewatch	·	1.5 km	MPC · JPL
607124	1999 CL_{160}	—	October 19, 2011	Mount Lemmon	Mount Lemmon Survey	·	1.7 km	MPC · JPL
607125	1999 CO_{160}	—	December 29, 2008	Mount Lemmon	Mount Lemmon Survey	·	560 m	MPC · JPL
607126	1999 EP_{15}	—	March 10, 1999	Kitt Peak	Spacewatch	·	600 m	MPC · JPL
607127	1999 FZ_{97}	—	December 18, 2007	Mount Lemmon	Mount Lemmon Survey	·	830 m	MPC · JPL
607128	1999 FD_{98}	—	April 25, 2006	Mount Lemmon	Mount Lemmon Survey	·	850 m	MPC · JPL
607129	1999 FE_{98}	—	August 16, 2012	Siding Spring	SSS	EUN	1.2 km	MPC · JPL
607130	1999 FH_{100}	—	October 12, 2016	Haleakala	Pan-STARRS 1	·	1.6 km	MPC · JPL
607131	1999 FU_{100}	—	September 10, 2007	Mount Lemmon	Mount Lemmon Survey	PHO	550 m	MPC · JPL
607132	1999 FJ_{101}	—	March 20, 1999	Apache Point	SDSS Collaboration	·	1.8 km	MPC · JPL
607133	1999 HN_{13}	—	January 11, 2015	Haleakala	Pan-STARRS 1	TIR	2.0 km	MPC · JPL
607134	1999 KQ_{21}	—	March 27, 2009	Mount Lemmon	Mount Lemmon Survey	·	620 m	MPC · JPL
607135	1999 NE_{16}	—	July 14, 1999	Socorro	LINEAR	·	980 m	MPC · JPL
607136	1999 OV_{5}	—	September 29, 2010	Mount Lemmon	Mount Lemmon Survey	·	850 m	MPC · JPL
607137	1999 RN_{233}	—	September 8, 1999	Catalina	CSS	(5)	1.7 km	MPC · JPL
607138	1999 RU_{259}	—	August 10, 2007	Kitt Peak	Spacewatch	·	2.0 km	MPC · JPL
607139	1999 SR_{23}	—	June 6, 1997	Mauna Kea	Veillet, C.	·	2.2 km	MPC · JPL
607140	1999 SQ_{28}	—	September 21, 1999	Eskridge	G. Bell, G. Hug	MAS	550 m	MPC · JPL
607141	1999 SG_{29}	—	September 18, 1999	Kitt Peak	Spacewatch	·	910 m	MPC · JPL
607142	1999 TF_{22}	—	October 3, 1999	Kitt Peak	Spacewatch	·	1.1 km	MPC · JPL
607143	1999 TP_{43}	—	October 3, 1999	Kitt Peak	Spacewatch	·	1.7 km	MPC · JPL
607144	1999 TC_{48}	—	October 4, 1999	Kitt Peak	Spacewatch	·	2.4 km	MPC · JPL
607145	1999 TE_{55}	—	October 6, 1999	Kitt Peak	Spacewatch	EOS	1.8 km	MPC · JPL
607146	1999 TM_{55}	—	October 6, 1999	Kitt Peak	Spacewatch	EOS	1.9 km	MPC · JPL
607147	1999 TL_{56}	—	October 6, 1999	Kitt Peak	Spacewatch	·	1 km	MPC · JPL
607148	1999 TZ_{56}	—	October 6, 1999	Kitt Peak	Spacewatch	·	1.4 km	MPC · JPL
607149	1999 TW_{57}	—	October 6, 1999	Kitt Peak	Spacewatch	·	1.5 km	MPC · JPL
607150	1999 TM_{62}	—	October 7, 1999	Kitt Peak	Spacewatch	BAR	910 m	MPC · JPL
607151	1999 TG_{66}	—	October 8, 1999	Kitt Peak	Spacewatch	·	710 m	MPC · JPL
607152	1999 TU_{66}	—	September 30, 1999	Kitt Peak	Spacewatch	·	2.0 km	MPC · JPL
607153	1999 TA_{71}	—	October 9, 1999	Kitt Peak	Spacewatch	·	1.6 km	MPC · JPL
607154	1999 TX_{73}	—	October 10, 1999	Kitt Peak	Spacewatch	·	810 m	MPC · JPL
607155	1999 TZ_{74}	—	October 10, 1999	Kitt Peak	Spacewatch	NYS	1.0 km	MPC · JPL
607156	1999 TX_{109}	—	October 4, 1999	Socorro	LINEAR	·	1.5 km	MPC · JPL
607157	1999 TZ_{157}	—	September 18, 1999	Kitt Peak	Spacewatch	·	1.1 km	MPC · JPL
607158	1999 TD_{218}	—	October 6, 1999	Socorro	LINEAR	(1547)	1.4 km	MPC · JPL
607159	1999 TC_{266}	—	October 3, 1999	Socorro	LINEAR	·	1.1 km	MPC · JPL
607160	1999 TQ_{307}	—	October 4, 1999	Kitt Peak	Spacewatch	·	1.6 km	MPC · JPL
607161	1999 TD_{310}	—	October 4, 1999	Kitt Peak	Spacewatch	·	2.0 km	MPC · JPL
607162	1999 TK_{311}	—	October 6, 1999	Kitt Peak	Spacewatch	·	1.3 km	MPC · JPL
607163	1999 TV_{316}	—	October 11, 1999	Kitt Peak	Spacewatch	·	1.3 km	MPC · JPL
607164	1999 TS_{337}	—	December 3, 2010	Mount Lemmon	Mount Lemmon Survey	·	1.8 km	MPC · JPL
607165	1999 TX_{337}	—	December 4, 2012	Kitt Peak	Spacewatch	·	1.6 km	MPC · JPL
607166	1999 TA_{338}	—	March 10, 2008	Kitt Peak	Spacewatch	·	960 m	MPC · JPL
607167	1999 TD_{338}	—	November 13, 2010	Mount Lemmon	Mount Lemmon Survey	·	1.9 km	MPC · JPL
607168	1999 TF_{338}	—	August 19, 2006	Kitt Peak	Spacewatch	V	560 m	MPC · JPL
607169	1999 TN_{338}	—	November 12, 2010	Kitt Peak	Spacewatch	·	2.4 km	MPC · JPL
607170	1999 TS_{338}	—	November 22, 2015	Mount Lemmon	Mount Lemmon Survey	EOS	1.5 km	MPC · JPL
607171	1999 TW_{338}	—	October 5, 2016	Mount Lemmon	Mount Lemmon Survey	·	1.3 km	MPC · JPL
607172	1999 TX_{338}	—	February 11, 2016	Mount Lemmon	Mount Lemmon Survey	·	810 m	MPC · JPL
607173	1999 TZ_{338}	—	February 17, 2010	Kitt Peak	Spacewatch	·	1.5 km	MPC · JPL
607174	1999 TU_{339}	—	July 14, 2013	Haleakala	Pan-STARRS 1	·	680 m	MPC · JPL
607175	1999 TV_{339}	—	October 8, 2012	Kitt Peak	Spacewatch	HNS	750 m	MPC · JPL
607176	1999 TM_{340}	—	June 8, 2011	Mount Lemmon	Mount Lemmon Survey	·	1.6 km	MPC · JPL
607177	1999 TQ_{340}	—	September 9, 2015	Haleakala	Pan-STARRS 1	·	1.7 km	MPC · JPL
607178	1999 TT_{340}	—	February 25, 2018	Mount Lemmon	Mount Lemmon Survey	·	2.4 km	MPC · JPL
607179	1999 TS_{341}	—	August 22, 2014	Haleakala	Pan-STARRS 1	·	1.5 km	MPC · JPL
607180	1999 TT_{342}	—	October 13, 1999	Apache Point	SDSS Collaboration	·	1.4 km	MPC · JPL
607181	1999 TV_{342}	—	October 13, 1999	Apache Point	SDSS Collaboration	·	1.4 km	MPC · JPL
607182	1999 TG_{343}	—	October 8, 1999	Kitt Peak	Spacewatch	NYS	720 m	MPC · JPL
607183	1999 UJ_{22}	—	October 31, 1999	Kitt Peak	Spacewatch	·	2.3 km	MPC · JPL
607184	1999 UC_{33}	—	October 12, 1999	Kitt Peak	Spacewatch	·	2.3 km	MPC · JPL
607185	1999 UU_{37}	—	October 14, 1999	Kitt Peak	Spacewatch	·	2.9 km	MPC · JPL
607186	1999 UT_{53}	—	October 19, 1999	Kitt Peak	Spacewatch	·	2.4 km	MPC · JPL
607187	1999 UA_{55}	—	October 19, 1999	Kitt Peak	Spacewatch	·	1.3 km	MPC · JPL
607188	1999 UC_{56}	—	October 20, 1999	Kitt Peak	Spacewatch	·	1.0 km	MPC · JPL
607189	1999 US_{65}	—	May 25, 2006	Mount Lemmon	Mount Lemmon Survey	HNS	1.3 km	MPC · JPL
607190	1999 UU_{65}	—	October 19, 1999	Kitt Peak	Spacewatch	·	790 m	MPC · JPL
607191	1999 UY_{65}	—	July 1, 2014	Haleakala	Pan-STARRS 1	EOS	1.4 km	MPC · JPL
607192	1999 UM_{66}	—	February 23, 2017	Mount Lemmon	Mount Lemmon Survey	H	440 m	MPC · JPL
607193	1999 VH_{120}	—	October 17, 1999	Kitt Peak	Spacewatch	·	1.4 km	MPC · JPL
607194	1999 VY_{128}	—	November 9, 1999	Kitt Peak	Spacewatch	·	2.5 km	MPC · JPL
607195	1999 VR_{132}	—	November 1, 1999	Kitt Peak	Spacewatch	·	2.3 km	MPC · JPL
607196	1999 VK_{134}	—	November 10, 1999	Kitt Peak	Spacewatch	·	2.1 km	MPC · JPL
607197	1999 VX_{152}	—	November 10, 1999	Kitt Peak	Spacewatch	·	1.6 km	MPC · JPL
607198	1999 VR_{171}	—	November 14, 1999	Socorro	LINEAR	JUN	1.1 km	MPC · JPL
607199	1999 VV_{174}	—	November 1, 1999	Kitt Peak	Spacewatch	·	1.2 km	MPC · JPL
607200	1999 VF_{215}	—	November 2, 1999	Kitt Peak	Spacewatch	·	1.1 km	MPC · JPL

== 607201–607300 ==
back to top

Designation			Discovery			Properties		Ref
Permanent	Provisional	Named after	Date	Site	Discoverer(s)	Category	Diam.	Ref
607201	1999 VE_{221}	—	November 4, 1999	Kitt Peak	Spacewatch	·	2.5 km	MPC · JPL
607202	1999 VS_{221}	—	November 5, 1999	Kitt Peak	Spacewatch	·	1.5 km	MPC · JPL
607203	1999 VZ_{225}	—	November 5, 1999	Kitt Peak	Spacewatch	·	1.6 km	MPC · JPL
607204	1999 VD_{232}	—	October 17, 2003	Kitt Peak	Spacewatch	EUN	1.2 km	MPC · JPL
607205	1999 VG_{232}	—	October 23, 2012	Mount Lemmon	Mount Lemmon Survey	·	1.2 km	MPC · JPL
607206	1999 VU_{232}	—	October 8, 2015	Haleakala	Pan-STARRS 1	·	2.0 km	MPC · JPL
607207	1999 VJ_{233}	—	December 14, 2015	Mount Lemmon	Mount Lemmon Survey	·	1.6 km	MPC · JPL
607208	1999 VP_{233}	—	January 17, 2005	Kitt Peak	Spacewatch	·	1.3 km	MPC · JPL
607209	1999 VA_{234}	—	October 29, 2010	Mount Lemmon	Mount Lemmon Survey	EOS	1.8 km	MPC · JPL
607210	1999 VE_{234}	—	November 1, 1999	Kitt Peak	Spacewatch	·	2.1 km	MPC · JPL
607211	1999 WD_{19}	—	November 30, 1999	Kitt Peak	Spacewatch	EOS	1.9 km	MPC · JPL
607212	1999 WF_{22}	—	November 17, 1999	Kitt Peak	Spacewatch	THM	1.5 km	MPC · JPL
607213	1999 WC_{29}	—	October 8, 2012	Haleakala	Pan-STARRS 1	·	1.0 km	MPC · JPL
607214	1999 XF_{79}	—	December 2, 1999	Kitt Peak	Spacewatch	·	3.6 km	MPC · JPL
607215	1999 XS_{146}	—	December 7, 1999	Kitt Peak	Spacewatch	·	1.7 km	MPC · JPL
607216	1999 XQ_{148}	—	December 7, 1999	Kitt Peak	Spacewatch	EOS	1.6 km	MPC · JPL
607217	1999 XQ_{214}	—	December 14, 1999	Socorro	LINEAR	ADE	2.4 km	MPC · JPL
607218	1999 XO_{218}	—	December 13, 1999	Kitt Peak	Spacewatch	·	2.3 km	MPC · JPL
607219	1999 XD_{226}	—	December 14, 1999	Kitt Peak	Spacewatch	·	3.0 km	MPC · JPL
607220	1999 XM_{246}	—	December 5, 1999	Kitt Peak	Spacewatch	·	1.4 km	MPC · JPL
607221	1999 XQ_{253}	—	December 12, 1999	Kitt Peak	Spacewatch	THM	1.5 km	MPC · JPL
607222	1999 XO_{254}	—	December 12, 1999	Kitt Peak	Spacewatch	·	2.0 km	MPC · JPL
607223	1999 XK_{255}	—	December 12, 1999	Kitt Peak	Spacewatch	·	1.5 km	MPC · JPL
607224	1999 XQ_{260}	—	December 7, 1999	Kitt Peak	Spacewatch	·	890 m	MPC · JPL
607225	1999 XU_{265}	—	February 5, 2013	Kitt Peak	Spacewatch	L4	7.8 km	MPC · JPL
607226	1999 XB_{266}	—	October 21, 2012	Haleakala	Pan-STARRS 1	HNS	820 m	MPC · JPL
607227	1999 XE_{266}	—	March 29, 2012	Haleakala	Pan-STARRS 1	EOS	1.4 km	MPC · JPL
607228	1999 XY_{266}	—	December 7, 1999	Kitt Peak	Spacewatch	EOS	1.6 km	MPC · JPL
607229	1999 YS_{20}	—	February 6, 2000	Kitt Peak	Spacewatch	VER	2.3 km	MPC · JPL
607230	1999 YZ_{29}	—	December 16, 1999	Kitt Peak	Spacewatch	·	2.8 km	MPC · JPL
607231	1999 YE_{30}	—	December 16, 1999	Kitt Peak	Spacewatch	·	3.2 km	MPC · JPL
607232	1999 YG_{30}	—	October 15, 2015	Mount Lemmon	Mount Lemmon Survey	TIR	2.0 km	MPC · JPL
607233	1999 YM_{30}	—	November 14, 2015	Mount Lemmon	Mount Lemmon Survey	·	2.4 km	MPC · JPL
607234	2000 AO	—	January 1, 2000	Piszkéstető	K. Sárneczky, L. Kiss	H	470 m	MPC · JPL
607235	2000 AM_{216}	—	December 14, 1999	Kitt Peak	Spacewatch	·	2.9 km	MPC · JPL
607236	2000 AU_{220}	—	January 8, 2000	Kitt Peak	Spacewatch	THM	1.9 km	MPC · JPL
607237	2000 AU_{225}	—	January 12, 2000	Kitt Peak	Spacewatch	·	1.7 km	MPC · JPL
607238	2000 AP_{257}	—	December 29, 2008	Kitt Peak	Spacewatch	·	1.5 km	MPC · JPL
607239	2000 AN_{258}	—	August 29, 2009	Catalina	CSS	NYS	1.0 km	MPC · JPL
607240	2000 AW_{258}	—	October 3, 2006	Mount Lemmon	Mount Lemmon Survey	MAS	560 m	MPC · JPL
607241	2000 AO_{259}	—	January 2, 2009	Mount Lemmon	Mount Lemmon Survey	·	1.3 km	MPC · JPL
607242	2000 AP_{259}	—	July 25, 2015	Haleakala	Pan-STARRS 1	·	1.8 km	MPC · JPL
607243	2000 AU_{259}	—	November 29, 2014	Mount Lemmon	Mount Lemmon Survey	3:2 · SHU	4.4 km	MPC · JPL
607244	2000 BX_{11}	—	January 28, 2000	Kitt Peak	Spacewatch	·	1.4 km	MPC · JPL
607245	2000 BX_{12}	—	January 28, 2000	Kitt Peak	Spacewatch	NYS	1.1 km	MPC · JPL
607246	2000 BJ_{30}	—	January 28, 2000	Kitt Peak	Spacewatch	·	1.8 km	MPC · JPL
607247	2000 BT_{30}	—	January 17, 2000	Mauna Kea	Veillet, C.	VER	2.9 km	MPC · JPL
607248	2000 BX_{38}	—	January 27, 2000	Kitt Peak	Spacewatch	·	3.1 km	MPC · JPL
607249	2000 BZ_{45}	—	January 28, 2000	Kitt Peak	Spacewatch	·	1.6 km	MPC · JPL
607250	2000 BJ_{46}	—	December 5, 2010	Mount Lemmon	Mount Lemmon Survey	NYS	820 m	MPC · JPL
607251	2000 BD_{47}	—	January 30, 2000	Kitt Peak	Spacewatch	·	1.3 km	MPC · JPL
607252	2000 BU_{52}	—	January 14, 2011	Kitt Peak	Spacewatch	·	3.5 km	MPC · JPL
607253	2000 BY_{52}	—	July 12, 2015	Haleakala	Pan-STARRS 1	·	1.9 km	MPC · JPL
607254	2000 BD_{53}	—	December 3, 2015	Mount Lemmon	Mount Lemmon Survey	·	1.9 km	MPC · JPL
607255	2000 CO_{41}	—	February 2, 2000	Socorro	LINEAR	·	2.1 km	MPC · JPL
607256	2000 CZ_{73}	—	January 30, 2000	Kitt Peak	Spacewatch	·	2.9 km	MPC · JPL
607257	2000 CV_{108}	—	February 4, 2000	Kitt Peak	Spacewatch	·	1.5 km	MPC · JPL
607258	2000 CQ_{118}	—	February 5, 2000	Kitt Peak	M. W. Buie, R. L. Millis	·	1.6 km	MPC · JPL
607259	2000 CW_{120}	—	February 2, 2000	Kitt Peak	Spacewatch	·	1.5 km	MPC · JPL
607260	2000 CU_{128}	—	February 3, 2000	Kitt Peak	Spacewatch	THM	1.9 km	MPC · JPL
607261	2000 CR_{132}	—	February 4, 2000	Kitt Peak	Spacewatch	·	2.8 km	MPC · JPL
607262	2000 CZ_{137}	—	February 4, 2000	Kitt Peak	Spacewatch	·	3.1 km	MPC · JPL
607263	2000 CL_{140}	—	January 28, 2000	Kitt Peak	Spacewatch	VER	2.7 km	MPC · JPL
607264	2000 CG_{141}	—	February 6, 2000	Kitt Peak	Spacewatch	·	1.7 km	MPC · JPL
607265	2000 CM_{142}	—	February 4, 2000	Kitt Peak	Spacewatch	·	2.3 km	MPC · JPL
607266	2000 CC_{145}	—	May 11, 2005	Mount Lemmon	Mount Lemmon Survey	MIS	2.8 km	MPC · JPL
607267	2000 CA_{151}	—	September 21, 2003	Kitt Peak	Spacewatch	·	1.3 km	MPC · JPL
607268	2000 CG_{151}	—	February 25, 2006	Mount Lemmon	Mount Lemmon Survey	·	2.8 km	MPC · JPL
607269	2000 CK_{151}	—	February 12, 2000	Apache Point	SDSS Collaboration	·	780 m	MPC · JPL
607270	2000 CZ_{151}	—	September 25, 2009	Kitt Peak	Spacewatch	·	2.3 km	MPC · JPL
607271	2000 CC_{152}	—	February 13, 2011	Mount Lemmon	Mount Lemmon Survey	·	2.4 km	MPC · JPL
607272	2000 CK_{152}	—	January 26, 2011	Kitt Peak	Spacewatch	·	970 m	MPC · JPL
607273	2000 CE_{154}	—	September 27, 2016	Haleakala	Pan-STARRS 1	·	1.4 km	MPC · JPL
607274	2000 CL_{155}	—	April 18, 2007	Mount Lemmon	Mount Lemmon Survey	THM	2.3 km	MPC · JPL
607275	2000 CM_{155}	—	January 31, 2006	Kitt Peak	Spacewatch	·	2.5 km	MPC · JPL
607276	2000 CN_{155}	—	February 11, 2000	Kitt Peak	Spacewatch	·	3.0 km	MPC · JPL
607277	2000 CJ_{156}	—	September 9, 2008	Mount Lemmon	Mount Lemmon Survey	VER	2.4 km	MPC · JPL
607278	2000 DW_{11}	—	February 27, 2000	Kitt Peak	Spacewatch	·	1.2 km	MPC · JPL
607279	2000 DP_{78}	—	February 29, 2000	Socorro	LINEAR	JUN	1.3 km	MPC · JPL
607280	2000 EX_{161}	—	March 3, 2000	Socorro	LINEAR	·	1.6 km	MPC · JPL
607281	2000 EY_{208}	—	November 14, 2007	Kitt Peak	Spacewatch	·	2.2 km	MPC · JPL
607282	2000 ED_{209}	—	March 12, 2005	Mount Lemmon	Mount Lemmon Survey	·	1.8 km	MPC · JPL
607283	2000 EG_{209}	—	May 4, 2014	Haleakala	Pan-STARRS 1	GEF	1.0 km	MPC · JPL
607284	2000 EX_{209}	—	January 25, 2015	Haleakala	Pan-STARRS 1	·	1.0 km	MPC · JPL
607285	2000 EB_{210}	—	December 22, 2012	Haleakala	Pan-STARRS 1	·	1.6 km	MPC · JPL
607286	2000 EE_{211}	—	January 30, 2017	Haleakala	Pan-STARRS 1	·	3.0 km	MPC · JPL
607287	2000 EG_{211}	—	February 19, 2009	Kitt Peak	Spacewatch	·	1.3 km	MPC · JPL
607288	2000 EH_{211}	—	March 19, 2017	Haleakala	Pan-STARRS 1	·	2.1 km	MPC · JPL
607289	2000 ET_{211}	—	November 5, 2016	Mount Lemmon	Mount Lemmon Survey	·	1.4 km	MPC · JPL
607290	2000 EZ_{211}	—	February 19, 2009	Kitt Peak	Spacewatch	·	1.2 km	MPC · JPL
607291	2000 EA_{212}	—	June 18, 2015	Haleakala	Pan-STARRS 1	·	1.5 km	MPC · JPL
607292	2000 FO_{1}	—	March 25, 2000	Kitt Peak	Spacewatch	·	2.3 km	MPC · JPL
607293	2000 FK_{9}	—	March 30, 2000	Kitt Peak	Spacewatch	HNS	1.3 km	MPC · JPL
607294	2000 FV_{64}	—	May 8, 2005	Kitt Peak	Spacewatch	HOF	2.3 km	MPC · JPL
607295	2000 FK_{67}	—	March 25, 2000	Kitt Peak	Spacewatch	MAS	830 m	MPC · JPL
607296	2000 FJ_{74}	—	December 4, 2007	Mount Lemmon	Mount Lemmon Survey	·	1.4 km	MPC · JPL
607297	2000 GZ_{23}	—	March 25, 2000	Kitt Peak	Spacewatch	·	480 m	MPC · JPL
607298	2000 GQ_{117}	—	April 2, 2000	Kitt Peak	Spacewatch	·	2.0 km	MPC · JPL
607299	2000 GS_{128}	—	April 5, 2000	Kitt Peak	Spacewatch	·	1.8 km	MPC · JPL
607300	2000 GO_{131}	—	April 7, 2000	Kitt Peak	Spacewatch	·	2.1 km	MPC · JPL

== 607301–607400 ==
back to top

Designation			Discovery			Properties		Ref
Permanent	Provisional	Named after	Date	Site	Discoverer(s)	Category	Diam.	Ref
607301	2000 GL_{150}	—	March 27, 2000	Kitt Peak	Spacewatch	·	1.0 km	MPC · JPL
607302	2000 GM_{181}	—	April 5, 2000	Socorro	LINEAR	·	930 m	MPC · JPL
607303	2000 GE_{188}	—	September 14, 2013	Mount Lemmon	Mount Lemmon Survey	·	1.1 km	MPC · JPL
607304	2000 GF_{188}	—	April 5, 2000	Kitt Peak	Spacewatch	HOF	2.7 km	MPC · JPL
607305	2000 GQ_{188}	—	August 27, 2014	Haleakala	Pan-STARRS 1	·	2.9 km	MPC · JPL
607306	2000 HP_{98}	—	April 27, 2000	Kitt Peak	Spacewatch	·	1.8 km	MPC · JPL
607307	2000 HO_{101}	—	April 27, 2000	Kitt Peak	Spacewatch	·	950 m	MPC · JPL
607308	2000 HJ_{106}	—	March 21, 2015	Catalina	CSS	·	1.3 km	MPC · JPL
607309	2000 JX_{94}	—	February 24, 2009	Mount Lemmon	Mount Lemmon Survey	·	2.2 km	MPC · JPL
607310	2000 JK_{95}	—	May 1, 2000	Kitt Peak	Spacewatch	·	1.7 km	MPC · JPL
607311	2000 JV_{95}	—	May 1, 2009	Mount Lemmon	Mount Lemmon Survey	·	1.5 km	MPC · JPL
607312	2000 JF_{97}	—	July 9, 2016	Haleakala	Pan-STARRS 1	PHO	610 m	MPC · JPL
607313	2000 KV_{84}	—	April 22, 2015	Catalina	CSS	·	1.0 km	MPC · JPL
607314	2000 LH_{7}	—	May 29, 2000	Kitt Peak	Spacewatch	·	1.3 km	MPC · JPL
607315	2000 OY_{61}	—	July 30, 2000	Cerro Tololo	Deep Ecliptic Survey	·	1.6 km	MPC · JPL
607316	2000 OB_{64}	—	July 31, 2000	Cerro Tololo	Deep Ecliptic Survey	KOR	1.4 km	MPC · JPL
607317	2000 OK_{65}	—	July 31, 2000	Cerro Tololo	Deep Ecliptic Survey	·	780 m	MPC · JPL
607318	2000 ON_{70}	—	November 1, 2006	Kitt Peak	Spacewatch	KOR	1.1 km	MPC · JPL
607319	2000 OW_{70}	—	July 31, 2000	Cerro Tololo	Deep Ecliptic Survey	·	810 m	MPC · JPL
607320	2000 OM_{71}	—	December 11, 2013	Haleakala	Pan-STARRS 1	PHO	820 m	MPC · JPL
607321	2000 OH_{72}	—	February 28, 2008	Mount Lemmon	Mount Lemmon Survey	KOR	1.1 km	MPC · JPL
607322	2000 PT_{32}	—	September 12, 2007	Kitt Peak	Spacewatch	·	730 m	MPC · JPL
607323	2000 PM_{33}	—	November 1, 2005	Mount Lemmon	Mount Lemmon Survey	·	1.1 km	MPC · JPL
607324	2000 QO_{236}	—	August 26, 2000	Cerro Tololo	Deep Ecliptic Survey	·	1.7 km	MPC · JPL
607325	2000 QG_{238}	—	August 25, 2000	Cerro Tololo	Deep Ecliptic Survey	·	750 m	MPC · JPL
607326	2000 QP_{238}	—	August 25, 2000	Cerro Tololo	Deep Ecliptic Survey	·	1.8 km	MPC · JPL
607327	2000 QS_{243}	—	August 20, 2000	Kitt Peak	Spacewatch	·	1.2 km	MPC · JPL
607328	2000 QZ_{248}	—	August 31, 2000	Kitt Peak	Spacewatch	·	560 m	MPC · JPL
607329	2000 QN_{255}	—	October 7, 2007	Kitt Peak	Spacewatch	·	670 m	MPC · JPL
607330	2000 QO_{255}	—	January 2, 2012	Mount Lemmon	Mount Lemmon Survey	·	530 m	MPC · JPL
607331	2000 QT_{255}	—	March 26, 2007	Kitt Peak	Spacewatch	·	820 m	MPC · JPL
607332	2000 QO_{258}	—	April 23, 2015	Haleakala	Pan-STARRS 1	·	870 m	MPC · JPL
607333	2000 QW_{258}	—	December 28, 2011	Kitt Peak	Spacewatch	·	430 m	MPC · JPL
607334	2000 QC_{260}	—	April 24, 2014	Cerro Tololo	DECam	KOR	1.0 km	MPC · JPL
607335	2000 RP_{108}	—	September 2, 2010	Mount Lemmon	Mount Lemmon Survey	·	630 m	MPC · JPL
607336	2000 RV_{108}	—	September 15, 2007	Kitt Peak	Spacewatch	·	490 m	MPC · JPL
607337	2000 RX_{108}	—	October 24, 2005	Mauna Kea	A. Boattini	·	850 m	MPC · JPL
607338	2000 RG_{109}	—	September 5, 2000	Apache Point	SDSS Collaboration	·	990 m	MPC · JPL
607339	2000 RH_{109}	—	March 11, 2008	Kitt Peak	Spacewatch	·	1.8 km	MPC · JPL
607340	2000 RX_{110}	—	December 25, 2009	Kitt Peak	Spacewatch	·	1.2 km	MPC · JPL
607341	2000 RA_{112}	—	December 31, 2013	Kitt Peak	Spacewatch	·	750 m	MPC · JPL
607342	2000 SO_{377}	—	March 11, 2002	Palomar	NEAT	·	1.2 km	MPC · JPL
607343	2000 SL_{378}	—	February 20, 2009	Kitt Peak	Spacewatch	·	640 m	MPC · JPL
607344	2000 SO_{379}	—	January 30, 2012	Mount Lemmon	Mount Lemmon Survey	H	420 m	MPC · JPL
607345	2000 SP_{379}	—	October 4, 2007	Kitt Peak	Spacewatch	·	710 m	MPC · JPL
607346	2000 SP_{380}	—	December 30, 2013	Mount Lemmon	Mount Lemmon Survey	·	710 m	MPC · JPL
607347	2000 SD_{381}	—	December 24, 2011	Mount Lemmon	Mount Lemmon Survey	·	1.7 km	MPC · JPL
607348	2000 SM_{381}	—	January 16, 2009	Kitt Peak	Spacewatch	·	4.3 km	MPC · JPL
607349	2000 SP_{381}	—	October 9, 2005	Kitt Peak	Spacewatch	·	1.5 km	MPC · JPL
607350	2000 SU_{381}	—	January 17, 2013	Kitt Peak	Spacewatch	·	1.9 km	MPC · JPL
607351	2000 SY_{381}	—	September 5, 2008	Kitt Peak	Spacewatch	·	1.2 km	MPC · JPL
607352	2000 SE_{384}	—	June 12, 2016	Mount Lemmon	Mount Lemmon Survey	KON	1.7 km	MPC · JPL
607353	2000 SK_{385}	—	October 15, 2007	Kitt Peak	Spacewatch	·	520 m	MPC · JPL
607354	2000 TL_{20}	—	October 1, 2000	Socorro	LINEAR	·	810 m	MPC · JPL
607355	2000 TL_{69}	—	January 7, 2010	Kitt Peak	Spacewatch	·	880 m	MPC · JPL
607356	2000 TR_{75}	—	August 28, 2005	Kitt Peak	Spacewatch	KOR	1.3 km	MPC · JPL
607357	2000 TN_{76}	—	August 27, 2016	Haleakala	Pan-STARRS 1	·	1.2 km	MPC · JPL
607358	2000 TD_{77}	—	September 23, 2015	Haleakala	Pan-STARRS 1	·	1.9 km	MPC · JPL
607359	2000 TM_{79}	—	August 23, 2008	Siding Spring	SSS	·	1.2 km	MPC · JPL
607360	2000 TQ_{79}	—	February 26, 2008	Mount Lemmon	Mount Lemmon Survey	·	1.4 km	MPC · JPL
607361	2000 TT_{79}	—	March 23, 2013	Mount Lemmon	Mount Lemmon Survey	TEL	1.4 km	MPC · JPL
607362	2000 TU_{79}	—	October 9, 2007	Mount Lemmon	Mount Lemmon Survey	·	550 m	MPC · JPL
607363	2000 TZ_{79}	—	October 1, 2000	Apache Point	SDSS Collaboration	·	1.8 km	MPC · JPL
607364	2000 TF_{80}	—	November 2, 2007	Mount Lemmon	Mount Lemmon Survey	·	420 m	MPC · JPL
607365	2000 TK_{81}	—	April 5, 2014	Haleakala	Pan-STARRS 1	EOS	1.2 km	MPC · JPL
607366	2000 TE_{82}	—	July 24, 2015	Haleakala	Pan-STARRS 1	KOR	950 m	MPC · JPL
607367	2000 UD_{116}	—	September 23, 2005	Kitt Peak	Spacewatch	·	1.7 km	MPC · JPL
607368	2000 VP_{65}	—	October 7, 2008	Kitt Peak	Spacewatch	·	910 m	MPC · JPL
607369	2000 VV_{65}	—	September 15, 2010	Mount Lemmon	Mount Lemmon Survey	·	480 m	MPC · JPL
607370	2000 WM_{64}	—	November 25, 2000	Kitt Peak	Spacewatch	·	940 m	MPC · JPL
607371	2000 WT_{65}	—	November 28, 2000	Kitt Peak	Spacewatch	·	1.3 km	MPC · JPL
607372 Colombounilanka	2000 WU_{178}	Colombounilanka	November 30, 2000	Kitt Peak	N. Samarasinha, T. Lauer	·	1.1 km	MPC · JPL
607373	2000 WC_{199}	—	November 17, 2007	Kitt Peak	Spacewatch	·	620 m	MPC · JPL
607374	2000 WT_{199}	—	October 10, 2008	Kitt Peak	Spacewatch	(5)	970 m	MPC · JPL
607375	2000 WW_{199}	—	March 18, 2010	Mount Lemmon	Mount Lemmon Survey	·	1.1 km	MPC · JPL
607376	2000 WZ_{199}	—	April 12, 2013	Haleakala	Pan-STARRS 1	·	2.2 km	MPC · JPL
607377	2000 WB_{200}	—	December 25, 2013	Mount Lemmon	Mount Lemmon Survey	·	1.2 km	MPC · JPL
607378	2000 WP_{201}	—	September 11, 2010	Mount Lemmon	Mount Lemmon Survey	(2076)	540 m	MPC · JPL
607379	2000 WJ_{202}	—	June 4, 2014	Haleakala	Pan-STARRS 1	·	2.7 km	MPC · JPL
607380	2000 WY_{202}	—	August 9, 2004	Siding Spring	SSS	·	2.3 km	MPC · JPL
607381	2000 WN_{203}	—	January 16, 2018	Haleakala	Pan-STARRS 1	EOS	1.6 km	MPC · JPL
607382	2000 WG_{204}	—	November 17, 2004	Siding Spring	SSS	·	980 m	MPC · JPL
607383	2000 XV_{55}	—	August 2, 2016	Haleakala	Pan-STARRS 1	(5)	1.1 km	MPC · JPL
607384	2000 XY_{55}	—	October 15, 2014	Kitt Peak	Spacewatch	·	610 m	MPC · JPL
607385	2000 XO_{56}	—	December 1, 2000	Kitt Peak	Spacewatch	·	1.7 km	MPC · JPL
607386	2000 YJ_{19}	—	December 21, 2000	Kitt Peak	Spacewatch	·	2.5 km	MPC · JPL
607387	2000 YF_{23}	—	December 28, 2000	Kitt Peak	Spacewatch	EOS	1.6 km	MPC · JPL
607388	2000 YG_{25}	—	December 21, 2000	Kitt Peak	Spacewatch	·	1.8 km	MPC · JPL
607389	2000 YO_{25}	—	December 29, 2000	Kitt Peak	Spacewatch	·	730 m	MPC · JPL
607390	2000 YZ_{141}	—	December 20, 2000	Kitt Peak	Deep Lens Survey	EUN	960 m	MPC · JPL
607391	2000 YA_{142}	—	December 20, 2000	Kitt Peak	Deep Lens Survey	EOS	1.8 km	MPC · JPL
607392	2000 YB_{142}	—	December 20, 2000	Kitt Peak	Deep Lens Survey	JUN	1.1 km	MPC · JPL
607393	2000 YO_{144}	—	January 10, 2014	Kitt Peak	Spacewatch	MAR	870 m	MPC · JPL
607394	2000 YP_{144}	—	January 4, 2014	Haleakala	Pan-STARRS 1	MAR	830 m	MPC · JPL
607395	2000 YD_{145}	—	December 12, 2015	Haleakala	Pan-STARRS 1	EOS	1.7 km	MPC · JPL
607396	2000 YJ_{145}	—	October 1, 2013	Kitt Peak	Spacewatch	·	3.8 km	MPC · JPL
607397	2000 YK_{145}	—	December 12, 2015	Haleakala	Pan-STARRS 1	·	1.9 km	MPC · JPL
607398	2000 YO_{145}	—	September 8, 2016	Haleakala	Pan-STARRS 1	EUN	1.1 km	MPC · JPL
607399	2000 YP_{145}	—	November 25, 2016	Mount Lemmon	Mount Lemmon Survey	·	1.6 km	MPC · JPL
607400	2000 YF_{146}	—	January 21, 2012	Kitt Peak	Spacewatch	·	730 m	MPC · JPL

== 607401–607500 ==
back to top

Designation			Discovery			Properties		Ref
Permanent	Provisional	Named after	Date	Site	Discoverer(s)	Category	Diam.	Ref
607401	2000 YH_{146}	—	July 30, 2014	Haleakala	Pan-STARRS 1	·	1.7 km	MPC · JPL
607402	2001 AM_{48}	—	December 21, 2000	Kitt Peak	Spacewatch	·	1.2 km	MPC · JPL
607403	2001 AL_{54}	—	January 19, 2012	Haleakala	Pan-STARRS 1	·	860 m	MPC · JPL
607404	2001 AN_{54}	—	December 6, 2011	Haleakala	Pan-STARRS 1	·	2.9 km	MPC · JPL
607405	2001 BO_{2}	—	January 17, 2001	Socorro	LINEAR	HNS	1.6 km	MPC · JPL
607406	2001 BE_{12}	—	January 19, 2001	Kitt Peak	Spacewatch	·	1.3 km	MPC · JPL
607407	2001 BC_{84}	—	June 17, 2015	Haleakala	Pan-STARRS 1	·	1.2 km	MPC · JPL
607408	2001 BD_{84}	—	October 9, 2012	Mount Lemmon	Mount Lemmon Survey	·	1.0 km	MPC · JPL
607409	2001 BH_{84}	—	December 18, 2014	Haleakala	Pan-STARRS 1	PHO	1.2 km	MPC · JPL
607410	2001 BN_{84}	—	January 10, 2006	Mount Lemmon	Mount Lemmon Survey	·	2.0 km	MPC · JPL
607411	2001 BR_{84}	—	October 27, 2016	Mount Lemmon	Mount Lemmon Survey	EUN	1.1 km	MPC · JPL
607412	2001 CQ_{50}	—	February 2, 2001	Kitt Peak	Spacewatch	·	950 m	MPC · JPL
607413	2001 CB_{51}	—	January 27, 2012	Mount Lemmon	Mount Lemmon Survey	·	2.5 km	MPC · JPL
607414	2001 DJ_{112}	—	November 10, 2010	Mount Lemmon	Mount Lemmon Survey	·	780 m	MPC · JPL
607415	2001 DN_{112}	—	November 28, 2010	Mount Lemmon	Mount Lemmon Survey	·	2.5 km	MPC · JPL
607416	2001 DX_{112}	—	September 11, 2007	Kitt Peak	Spacewatch	·	1.4 km	MPC · JPL
607417	2001 DC_{113}	—	October 18, 2012	Haleakala	Pan-STARRS 1	·	1.4 km	MPC · JPL
607418	2001 DH_{113}	—	March 5, 2014	Haleakala	Pan-STARRS 1	·	1.5 km	MPC · JPL
607419	2001 DJ_{113}	—	September 17, 2003	Kitt Peak	Spacewatch	·	3.5 km	MPC · JPL
607420	2001 DP_{113}	—	January 11, 2008	Kitt Peak	Spacewatch	MAS	680 m	MPC · JPL
607421	2001 DY_{113}	—	January 16, 2011	Mount Lemmon	Mount Lemmon Survey	·	2.6 km	MPC · JPL
607422	2001 DL_{114}	—	March 28, 2014	Catalina	CSS	·	1.6 km	MPC · JPL
607423	2001 DQ_{114}	—	February 21, 2012	Mount Lemmon	Mount Lemmon Survey	·	1.8 km	MPC · JPL
607424	2001 DU_{114}	—	February 22, 2001	Apache Point	SDSS	·	1.4 km	MPC · JPL
607425	2001 DZ_{114}	—	February 26, 2012	Kitt Peak	Spacewatch	MAS	570 m	MPC · JPL
607426	2001 DE_{115}	—	August 30, 2014	Mount Lemmon	Mount Lemmon Survey	EOS	1.6 km	MPC · JPL
607427	2001 DH_{115}	—	July 25, 2014	Haleakala	Pan-STARRS 1	·	2.3 km	MPC · JPL
607428	2001 DK_{115}	—	October 22, 2012	Haleakala	Pan-STARRS 1	·	1.2 km	MPC · JPL
607429	2001 DS_{115}	—	October 5, 2016	Mount Lemmon	Mount Lemmon Survey	MAR	930 m	MPC · JPL
607430	2001 DV_{115}	—	December 12, 2015	Haleakala	Pan-STARRS 1	·	1.4 km	MPC · JPL
607431	2001 DZ_{115}	—	December 6, 2015	Mount Lemmon	Mount Lemmon Survey	·	2.0 km	MPC · JPL
607432	2001 DB_{116}	—	June 13, 2015	Mount Lemmon	Mount Lemmon Survey	H	390 m	MPC · JPL
607433	2001 DV_{116}	—	January 28, 2017	Haleakala	Pan-STARRS 1	EOS	1.7 km	MPC · JPL
607434	2001 DZ_{116}	—	January 12, 2008	Mount Lemmon	Mount Lemmon Survey	·	620 m	MPC · JPL
607435	2001 DM_{117}	—	October 2, 2006	Mount Lemmon	Mount Lemmon Survey	·	720 m	MPC · JPL
607436	2001 DO_{117}	—	January 10, 2014	Mount Lemmon	Mount Lemmon Survey	·	1.5 km	MPC · JPL
607437	2001 DX_{118}	—	August 28, 2014	Haleakala	Pan-STARRS 1	·	2.2 km	MPC · JPL
607438	2001 DH_{119}	—	May 14, 2005	Mount Lemmon	Mount Lemmon Survey	NYS	1 km	MPC · JPL
607439	2001 DO_{119}	—	May 19, 2018	Haleakala	Pan-STARRS 1	·	1.8 km	MPC · JPL
607440	2001 DQ_{119}	—	March 17, 2001	Kitt Peak	Spacewatch	·	1.7 km	MPC · JPL
607441	2001 DY_{119}	—	November 3, 2015	Mount Lemmon	Mount Lemmon Survey	·	1.6 km	MPC · JPL
607442	2001 FE_{1}	—	March 16, 2001	Kitt Peak	Spacewatch	HNS	900 m	MPC · JPL
607443	2001 FS_{1}	—	March 19, 2001	Kanab	Sheridan, E.	·	820 m	MPC · JPL
607444	2001 FW_{29}	—	March 19, 2001	Haleakala	NEAT	JUN	1.5 km	MPC · JPL
607445	2001 FZ_{83}	—	March 26, 2001	Kitt Peak	Spacewatch	(1298)	2.8 km	MPC · JPL
607446	2001 FN_{110}	—	March 18, 2001	Socorro	LINEAR	·	1.6 km	MPC · JPL
607447	2001 FG_{125}	—	March 20, 2001	Haleakala	NEAT	·	790 m	MPC · JPL
607448	2001 FU_{134}	—	March 21, 2001	Anderson Mesa	LONEOS	·	1.5 km	MPC · JPL
607449	2001 FS_{151}	—	February 25, 2001	Haleakala	NEAT	TIR	3.2 km	MPC · JPL
607450	2001 FK_{181}	—	March 21, 2001	Kitt Peak	Spacewatch	(12739)	1.3 km	MPC · JPL
607451	2001 FS_{183}	—	March 26, 2001	Kitt Peak	Spacewatch	·	3.6 km	MPC · JPL
607452	2001 FB_{189}	—	March 16, 2001	Kitt Peak	Spacewatch	·	1.0 km	MPC · JPL
607453	2001 FF_{201}	—	March 21, 2001	Kitt Peak	SKADS	·	700 m	MPC · JPL
607454	2001 FW_{201}	—	September 10, 2007	Mount Lemmon	Mount Lemmon Survey	·	1.3 km	MPC · JPL
607455	2001 FT_{202}	—	March 21, 2001	Kitt Peak	SKADS	·	1.3 km	MPC · JPL
607456	2001 FG_{204}	—	March 21, 2001	Kitt Peak	SKADS	·	870 m	MPC · JPL
607457	2001 FV_{205}	—	March 21, 2001	Kitt Peak	SKADS	·	1.9 km	MPC · JPL
607458	2001 FD_{206}	—	August 27, 2009	Kitt Peak	Spacewatch	·	2.8 km	MPC · JPL
607459	2001 FG_{206}	—	March 21, 2001	Kitt Peak	Spacewatch	MAS	550 m	MPC · JPL
607460	2001 FX_{206}	—	March 21, 2001	Kitt Peak	Spacewatch	·	1.4 km	MPC · JPL
607461	2001 FT_{207}	—	February 26, 2008	Mount Lemmon	Mount Lemmon Survey	·	730 m	MPC · JPL
607462	2001 FH_{209}	—	March 20, 2001	Kitt Peak	Spacewatch	·	880 m	MPC · JPL
607463	2001 FV_{209}	—	August 28, 2006	Catalina	CSS	·	940 m	MPC · JPL
607464	2001 FT_{213}	—	March 21, 2001	Kitt Peak	Spacewatch	·	2.9 km	MPC · JPL
607465	2001 FK_{214}	—	August 24, 2003	Cerro Tololo	Deep Ecliptic Survey	·	1.8 km	MPC · JPL
607466	2001 FG_{216}	—	March 21, 2001	Kitt Peak	SKADS	·	1.1 km	MPC · JPL
607467	2001 FG_{217}	—	March 25, 2001	Kitt Peak	Deep Ecliptic Survey	·	850 m	MPC · JPL
607468	2001 FW_{218}	—	October 16, 2009	Mount Lemmon	Mount Lemmon Survey	URS	2.5 km	MPC · JPL
607469	2001 FX_{219}	—	October 23, 2006	Kitt Peak	Spacewatch	(2076)	670 m	MPC · JPL
607470	2001 FK_{225}	—	March 22, 2001	Kitt Peak	SKADS	MAS	430 m	MPC · JPL
607471	2001 FE_{230}	—	March 26, 2001	Kitt Peak	Deep Ecliptic Survey	·	1.1 km	MPC · JPL
607472	2001 FS_{230}	—	March 29, 2001	Kitt Peak	SKADS	·	1.1 km	MPC · JPL
607473	2001 FM_{232}	—	August 15, 2009	Kitt Peak	Spacewatch	THM	1.8 km	MPC · JPL
607474	2001 FH_{242}	—	September 16, 2003	Kitt Peak	Spacewatch	·	2.5 km	MPC · JPL
607475	2001 FW_{242}	—	November 17, 2009	Mount Lemmon	Mount Lemmon Survey	TIR	2.5 km	MPC · JPL
607476	2001 FW_{243}	—	March 29, 2001	Haleakala	NEAT	·	1.4 km	MPC · JPL
607477	2001 FY_{243}	—	February 9, 2008	Mount Lemmon	Mount Lemmon Survey	·	1.3 km	MPC · JPL
607478	2001 FD_{244}	—	February 10, 2014	Haleakala	Pan-STARRS 1	·	2.1 km	MPC · JPL
607479	2001 FM_{244}	—	June 17, 2015	Haleakala	Pan-STARRS 1	·	1.4 km	MPC · JPL
607480	2001 FN_{244}	—	November 19, 2003	Kitt Peak	Spacewatch	·	1.8 km	MPC · JPL
607481	2001 FD_{245}	—	March 31, 2001	Kitt Peak	Spacewatch	·	2.6 km	MPC · JPL
607482	2001 FH_{245}	—	February 28, 2008	Mount Lemmon	Mount Lemmon Survey	·	1.1 km	MPC · JPL
607483	2001 FW_{245}	—	April 1, 2014	Kitt Peak	Spacewatch	·	920 m	MPC · JPL
607484	2001 FR_{246}	—	March 18, 2007	Kitt Peak	Spacewatch	·	2.4 km	MPC · JPL
607485	2001 FX_{246}	—	February 27, 2012	Haleakala	Pan-STARRS 1	·	650 m	MPC · JPL
607486	2001 FB_{247}	—	October 10, 2012	Mount Lemmon	Mount Lemmon Survey	MAR	830 m	MPC · JPL
607487	2001 FO_{248}	—	March 24, 2001	Kitt Peak	Spacewatch	HYG	2.2 km	MPC · JPL
607488	2001 GE_{12}	—	April 15, 2001	Kitt Peak	Spacewatch	MAS	470 m	MPC · JPL
607489	2001 HB_{24}	—	April 26, 2001	Kitt Peak	Spacewatch	·	1.2 km	MPC · JPL
607490	2001 HR_{38}	—	April 26, 2001	Kitt Peak	Spacewatch	·	1.7 km	MPC · JPL
607491	2001 HW_{68}	—	October 24, 2009	Mount Lemmon	Mount Lemmon Survey	·	3.6 km	MPC · JPL
607492	2001 HF_{69}	—	September 25, 2012	Mount Lemmon	Mount Lemmon Survey	·	1.4 km	MPC · JPL
607493	2001 HJ_{69}	—	April 20, 2007	Kitt Peak	Spacewatch	·	2.9 km	MPC · JPL
607494	2001 HO_{69}	—	March 1, 2005	Kitt Peak	Spacewatch	·	1.5 km	MPC · JPL
607495	2001 HE_{70}	—	May 8, 2006	Mount Lemmon	Mount Lemmon Survey	·	1.5 km	MPC · JPL
607496	2001 HK_{70}	—	October 18, 2009	Mount Lemmon	Mount Lemmon Survey	EOS	1.8 km	MPC · JPL
607497	2001 HM_{70}	—	October 19, 2006	Mount Lemmon	Mount Lemmon Survey	NYS	830 m	MPC · JPL
607498	2001 HU_{70}	—	August 15, 2009	Kitt Peak	Spacewatch	MAS	590 m	MPC · JPL
607499	2001 HZ_{70}	—	December 24, 2017	Haleakala	Pan-STARRS 1	PAD	1.2 km	MPC · JPL
607500	2001 HB_{71}	—	December 21, 2008	Kitt Peak	Spacewatch	·	1.7 km	MPC · JPL

== 607501–607600 ==
back to top

Designation			Discovery			Properties		Ref
Permanent	Provisional	Named after	Date	Site	Discoverer(s)	Category	Diam.	Ref
607501	2001 KL_{69}	—	May 22, 2001	Anderson Mesa	LONEOS	PHO	1.1 km	MPC · JPL
607502	2001 KE_{72}	—	May 24, 2001	Socorro	LINEAR	·	3.1 km	MPC · JPL
607503	2001 KU_{72}	—	April 27, 2001	Socorro	LINEAR	·	4.0 km	MPC · JPL
607504	2001 KG_{79}	—	November 14, 2015	Mount Lemmon	Mount Lemmon Survey	·	1.9 km	MPC · JPL
607505	2001 KQ_{79}	—	February 28, 2008	Kitt Peak	Spacewatch	·	760 m	MPC · JPL
607506	2001 KW_{79}	—	December 31, 2008	Mount Lemmon	Mount Lemmon Survey	·	2.0 km	MPC · JPL
607507	2001 KZ_{79}	—	February 11, 2008	Mount Lemmon	Mount Lemmon Survey	·	1.1 km	MPC · JPL
607508	2001 KG_{80}	—	June 17, 2005	Mount Lemmon	Mount Lemmon Survey	·	1.1 km	MPC · JPL
607509	2001 KJ_{80}	—	December 29, 2014	Haleakala	Pan-STARRS 1	·	1.4 km	MPC · JPL
607510	2001 KK_{80}	—	October 10, 2007	Mount Lemmon	Mount Lemmon Survey	AGN	1.0 km	MPC · JPL
607511	2001 KD_{81}	—	March 13, 2012	Kitt Peak	Spacewatch	·	2.1 km	MPC · JPL
607512	2001 KH_{81}	—	March 16, 2012	Mount Lemmon	Mount Lemmon Survey	LIX	3.2 km	MPC · JPL
607513	2001 KM_{81}	—	April 27, 2012	Haleakala	Pan-STARRS 1	EOS	1.6 km	MPC · JPL
607514	2001 KT_{81}	—	August 13, 2012	Haleakala	Pan-STARRS 1	·	1.2 km	MPC · JPL
607515	2001 KG_{82}	—	August 23, 2014	Haleakala	Pan-STARRS 1	·	2.5 km	MPC · JPL
607516	2001 KZ_{82}	—	April 10, 2008	Catalina	CSS	PHO	830 m	MPC · JPL
607517	2001 KP_{83}	—	April 11, 2005	Mount Lemmon	Mount Lemmon Survey	·	1.2 km	MPC · JPL
607518	2001 KB_{84}	—	September 18, 2011	Mount Lemmon	Mount Lemmon Survey	MRX	820 m	MPC · JPL
607519	2001 KG_{85}	—	July 22, 2010	WISE	WISE	·	1.6 km	MPC · JPL
607520	2001 KM_{85}	—	September 28, 2014	Haleakala	Pan-STARRS 1	·	2.7 km	MPC · JPL
607521	2001 KO_{85}	—	October 3, 2014	Kitt Peak	Spacewatch	·	2.7 km	MPC · JPL
607522	2001 KH_{86}	—	April 21, 2012	Haleakala	Pan-STARRS 1	·	1.2 km	MPC · JPL
607523	2001 KU_{86}	—	August 9, 2013	Kitt Peak	Spacewatch	·	800 m	MPC · JPL
607524	2001 KJ_{87}	—	April 12, 2012	Haleakala	Pan-STARRS 1	·	1.1 km	MPC · JPL
607525	2001 KN_{87}	—	October 8, 2007	Mount Lemmon	Mount Lemmon Survey	·	1.3 km	MPC · JPL
607526	2001 KO_{87}	—	November 24, 2009	Kitt Peak	Spacewatch	·	2.3 km	MPC · JPL
607527	2001 KH_{89}	—	May 22, 2001	Cerro Tololo	Deep Ecliptic Survey	PHO	810 m	MPC · JPL
607528	2001 MW_{31}	—	June 27, 2014	Haleakala	Pan-STARRS 1	·	1.9 km	MPC · JPL
607529	2001 MZ_{31}	—	November 8, 2007	Mount Lemmon	Mount Lemmon Survey	·	2.0 km	MPC · JPL
607530	2001 NP_{22}	—	July 14, 2001	Palomar	NEAT	·	620 m	MPC · JPL
607531	2001 NF_{23}	—	April 28, 2004	Kitt Peak	Spacewatch	·	610 m	MPC · JPL
607532	2001 OF_{114}	—	January 28, 2011	Mount Lemmon	Mount Lemmon Survey	·	1.3 km	MPC · JPL
607533	2001 OU_{114}	—	June 17, 2015	Haleakala	Pan-STARRS 1	TIN	920 m	MPC · JPL
607534	2001 PC_{16}	—	August 9, 2001	Palomar	NEAT	·	640 m	MPC · JPL
607535	2001 PE_{19}	—	August 10, 2001	Palomar	NEAT	·	690 m	MPC · JPL
607536	2001 PD_{52}	—	August 15, 2001	Haleakala	NEAT	NYS	1.2 km	MPC · JPL
607537	2001 PE_{68}	—	August 14, 2001	Haleakala	NEAT	·	630 m	MPC · JPL
607538	2001 QN_{33}	—	July 11, 2001	Palomar	NEAT	·	720 m	MPC · JPL
607539	2001 QY_{150}	—	August 20, 2001	Palomar	NEAT	·	4.0 km	MPC · JPL
607540	2001 QW_{167}	—	August 24, 2001	Haleakala	NEAT	·	610 m	MPC · JPL
607541	2001 QW_{175}	—	August 23, 2001	Kitt Peak	Spacewatch	·	980 m	MPC · JPL
607542	2001 QR_{305}	—	September 19, 2001	Kitt Peak	Spacewatch	·	1.5 km	MPC · JPL
607543	2001 QJ_{322}	—	August 20, 2001	Cerro Tololo	Deep Ecliptic Survey	KOR	1.2 km	MPC · JPL
607544	2001 QW_{335}	—	September 23, 2011	Haleakala	Pan-STARRS 1	KOR	1.1 km	MPC · JPL
607545	2001 QY_{335}	—	January 11, 2011	Kitt Peak	Spacewatch	·	1.0 km	MPC · JPL
607546	2001 QL_{336}	—	October 5, 2014	Haleakala	Pan-STARRS 1	·	3.4 km	MPC · JPL
607547	2001 QU_{337}	—	August 27, 2001	Kitt Peak	Spacewatch	·	1.0 km	MPC · JPL
607548	2001 QX_{337}	—	October 21, 2017	Mount Lemmon	Mount Lemmon Survey	PHO	860 m	MPC · JPL
607549	2001 RB_{52}	—	September 12, 2001	Socorro	LINEAR	·	2.1 km	MPC · JPL
607550	2001 RV_{139}	—	September 12, 2001	Socorro	LINEAR	·	1.7 km	MPC · JPL
607551	2001 RE_{157}	—	September 12, 2001	Kitt Peak	Spacewatch	·	1.7 km	MPC · JPL
607552	2001 SN_{12}	—	August 16, 2001	Socorro	LINEAR	·	2.2 km	MPC · JPL
607553	2001 SX_{88}	—	August 27, 2001	Kitt Peak	Spacewatch	·	1.2 km	MPC · JPL
607554	2001 SJ_{95}	—	September 20, 2001	Socorro	LINEAR	·	1.8 km	MPC · JPL
607555	2001 SP_{126}	—	September 16, 2001	Socorro	LINEAR	BRA	1.4 km	MPC · JPL
607556	2001 SY_{215}	—	September 19, 2001	Socorro	LINEAR	·	1.1 km	MPC · JPL
607557	2001 SA_{259}	—	September 20, 2001	Socorro	LINEAR	·	2.0 km	MPC · JPL
607558	2001 ST_{307}	—	September 21, 2001	Socorro	LINEAR	·	520 m	MPC · JPL
607559	2001 SM_{326}	—	September 18, 2001	Kitt Peak	Spacewatch	·	460 m	MPC · JPL
607560	2001 SL_{336}	—	August 24, 2001	Kitt Peak	Spacewatch	KOR	1.2 km	MPC · JPL
607561	2001 SJ_{357}	—	September 26, 2005	Kitt Peak	Spacewatch	MAS	600 m	MPC · JPL
607562	2001 SK_{357}	—	October 1, 2005	Kitt Peak	Spacewatch	·	1.4 km	MPC · JPL
607563	2001 SQ_{357}	—	September 18, 2001	Apache Point	SDSS Collaboration	·	720 m	MPC · JPL
607564	2001 SQ_{358}	—	August 28, 2014	Haleakala	Pan-STARRS 1	·	600 m	MPC · JPL
607565	2001 SK_{360}	—	September 28, 2001	Palomar	NEAT	·	1.9 km	MPC · JPL
607566	2001 SM_{361}	—	August 7, 2013	Kitt Peak	Spacewatch	·	870 m	MPC · JPL
607567	2001 SO_{361}	—	October 23, 2001	Kitt Peak	Spacewatch	H	330 m	MPC · JPL
607568	2001 SZ_{362}	—	September 2, 2013	Mount Lemmon	Mount Lemmon Survey	·	2.6 km	MPC · JPL
607569	2001 TD_{4}	—	October 7, 2001	Palomar	NEAT	·	570 m	MPC · JPL
607570	2001 TD_{161}	—	May 24, 2001	Cerro Tololo	Deep Ecliptic Survey	·	560 m	MPC · JPL
607571	2001 TG_{237}	—	October 3, 2006	Mount Lemmon	Mount Lemmon Survey	·	2.9 km	MPC · JPL
607572	2001 TC_{261}	—	October 8, 2001	Palomar	NEAT	V	680 m	MPC · JPL
607573	2001 TE_{263}	—	April 1, 2008	Mount Lemmon	Mount Lemmon Survey	·	1.5 km	MPC · JPL
607574	2001 TB_{264}	—	September 18, 2006	Kitt Peak	Spacewatch	·	1.5 km	MPC · JPL
607575	2001 TU_{264}	—	August 9, 2013	Kitt Peak	Spacewatch	·	2.7 km	MPC · JPL
607576	2001 TV_{265}	—	April 15, 2007	Kitt Peak	Spacewatch	·	480 m	MPC · JPL
607577	2001 TX_{266}	—	October 11, 2005	Kitt Peak	Spacewatch	·	1.1 km	MPC · JPL
607578	2001 UO_{105}	—	September 20, 2001	Socorro	LINEAR	·	1.9 km	MPC · JPL
607579	2001 UH_{132}	—	October 20, 2001	Socorro	LINEAR	·	3.5 km	MPC · JPL
607580	2001 UV_{166}	—	October 24, 2001	Kitt Peak	Spacewatch	·	2.0 km	MPC · JPL
607581	2001 UP_{229}	—	January 23, 2006	Kitt Peak	Spacewatch	·	540 m	MPC · JPL
607582	2001 UN_{232}	—	September 28, 2001	Palomar	NEAT	·	610 m	MPC · JPL
607583	2001 UE_{233}	—	July 13, 2016	Mount Lemmon	Mount Lemmon Survey	·	1.1 km	MPC · JPL
607584	2001 UN_{233}	—	December 22, 2008	Mount Lemmon	Mount Lemmon Survey	·	610 m	MPC · JPL
607585	2001 UQ_{233}	—	October 23, 2006	Kitt Peak	Spacewatch	·	1.6 km	MPC · JPL
607586	2001 UL_{234}	—	April 20, 2004	Kitt Peak	Spacewatch	·	1.7 km	MPC · JPL
607587	2001 UD_{235}	—	October 18, 2001	Kitt Peak	Spacewatch	·	1.0 km	MPC · JPL
607588	2001 UF_{235}	—	September 21, 2011	Kitt Peak	Spacewatch	·	520 m	MPC · JPL
607589	2001 UP_{235}	—	November 27, 2006	Kitt Peak	Spacewatch	·	1.3 km	MPC · JPL
607590	2001 UN_{237}	—	October 29, 2005	Kitt Peak	Spacewatch	·	1.2 km	MPC · JPL
607591	2001 UZ_{238}	—	October 31, 2006	Mount Lemmon	Mount Lemmon Survey	·	1.5 km	MPC · JPL
607592	2001 UW_{239}	—	April 25, 2014	Mount Lemmon	Mount Lemmon Survey	KOR	1.1 km	MPC · JPL
607593	2001 VQ_{22}	—	October 21, 2001	Socorro	LINEAR	·	1.4 km	MPC · JPL
607594	2001 VY_{108}	—	October 11, 1993	La Silla	E. W. Elst	·	1.4 km	MPC · JPL
607595	2001 VU_{134}	—	February 13, 2013	Haleakala	Pan-STARRS 1	·	2.2 km	MPC · JPL
607596	2001 VU_{135}	—	March 13, 2013	Kitt Peak	Spacewatch	·	1.6 km	MPC · JPL
607597	2001 VA_{138}	—	October 4, 2006	Mount Lemmon	Mount Lemmon Survey	·	2.1 km	MPC · JPL
607598	2001 WU_{65}	—	November 20, 2001	Socorro	LINEAR	KOR	1.4 km	MPC · JPL
607599	2001 WJ_{104}	—	December 9, 2005	Socorro	LINEAR	EUN	1.7 km	MPC · JPL
607600	2001 WS_{104}	—	October 25, 2005	Mount Lemmon	Mount Lemmon Survey	·	1.3 km	MPC · JPL

== 607601–607700 ==
back to top

Designation			Discovery			Properties		Ref
Permanent	Provisional	Named after	Date	Site	Discoverer(s)	Category	Diam.	Ref
607601	2001 WT_{104}	—	October 23, 2006	Kitt Peak	Spacewatch	EOS	1.6 km	MPC · JPL
607602	2001 WD_{105}	—	November 3, 2005	Mount Lemmon	Mount Lemmon Survey	·	1.6 km	MPC · JPL
607603	2001 WX_{106}	—	September 29, 2010	Mount Lemmon	Mount Lemmon Survey	·	1.9 km	MPC · JPL
607604	2001 XD_{34}	—	December 9, 2001	Socorro	LINEAR	·	1.1 km	MPC · JPL
607605	2001 XK_{145}	—	December 14, 2001	Socorro	LINEAR	·	780 m	MPC · JPL
607606	2001 XC_{177}	—	December 14, 2001	Socorro	LINEAR	·	2.1 km	MPC · JPL
607607	2001 XO_{258}	—	December 8, 2001	Anderson Mesa	LONEOS	·	1.5 km	MPC · JPL
607608	2001 XA_{268}	—	December 2, 2005	Kitt Peak	Spacewatch	·	1.5 km	MPC · JPL
607609	2001 XK_{268}	—	July 16, 2004	Siding Spring	SSS	EUN	1.5 km	MPC · JPL
607610	2001 YY_{31}	—	December 18, 2001	Socorro	LINEAR	BRA	1.1 km	MPC · JPL
607611	2001 YX_{63}	—	December 18, 2001	Socorro	LINEAR	·	1.6 km	MPC · JPL
607612	2001 YH_{162}	—	October 7, 2005	Kitt Peak	Spacewatch	KOR	1.1 km	MPC · JPL
607613	2001 YQ_{163}	—	December 10, 2014	Mount Lemmon	Mount Lemmon Survey	·	610 m	MPC · JPL
607614	2001 YS_{163}	—	February 14, 2009	Mount Lemmon	Mount Lemmon Survey	·	500 m	MPC · JPL
607615	2002 AJ_{33}	—	January 6, 2002	Kitt Peak	Spacewatch	·	1.1 km	MPC · JPL
607616	2002 AC_{69}	—	January 13, 2002	Kitt Peak	Spacewatch	·	2.6 km	MPC · JPL
607617	2002 AG_{127}	—	January 13, 2002	Socorro	LINEAR	·	730 m	MPC · JPL
607618	2002 AD_{161}	—	January 13, 2002	Socorro	LINEAR	·	1.3 km	MPC · JPL
607619	2002 AL_{210}	—	August 29, 2005	Kitt Peak	Spacewatch	·	1.5 km	MPC · JPL
607620	2002 AC_{211}	—	January 7, 2002	Kitt Peak	Spacewatch	·	920 m	MPC · JPL
607621	2002 AV_{211}	—	April 13, 2013	Haleakala	Pan-STARRS 1	·	760 m	MPC · JPL
607622	2002 AB_{212}	—	September 23, 2014	Mount Lemmon	Mount Lemmon Survey	·	520 m	MPC · JPL
607623	2002 AA_{213}	—	January 19, 2012	Haleakala	Pan-STARRS 1	·	570 m	MPC · JPL
607624	2002 AJ_{214}	—	January 18, 2012	Kitt Peak	Spacewatch	·	580 m	MPC · JPL
607625	2002 AP_{216}	—	March 13, 2013	Mount Lemmon	Mount Lemmon Survey	·	1.5 km	MPC · JPL
607626	2002 AZ_{216}	—	October 2, 2014	Haleakala	Pan-STARRS 1	·	540 m	MPC · JPL
607627	2002 AB_{217}	—	January 12, 2002	Campo Imperatore	CINEOS	·	1.0 km	MPC · JPL
607628	2002 BP_{31}	—	January 21, 2002	Kitt Peak	Spacewatch	·	1.3 km	MPC · JPL
607629	2002 BW_{32}	—	April 16, 2013	Kitt Peak	Spacewatch	·	830 m	MPC · JPL
607630	2002 BD_{33}	—	March 6, 2008	Bergisch Gladbach	W. Bickel	·	1.7 km	MPC · JPL
607631	2002 CG_{26}	—	February 7, 2002	Kitt Peak	Spacewatch	H	420 m	MPC · JPL
607632	2002 CK_{115}	—	February 7, 2002	Palomar	NEAT	PHO	810 m	MPC · JPL
607633	2002 CY_{149}	—	February 10, 2002	Socorro	LINEAR	·	910 m	MPC · JPL
607634	2002 CD_{157}	—	February 7, 2002	Socorro	LINEAR	·	1.9 km	MPC · JPL
607635	2002 CF_{246}	—	February 13, 2002	Kitt Peak	Spacewatch	·	1.3 km	MPC · JPL
607636	2002 CF_{287}	—	October 1, 2005	Kitt Peak	Spacewatch	·	1.4 km	MPC · JPL
607637	2002 CQ_{288}	—	February 10, 2002	Socorro	LINEAR	·	1.7 km	MPC · JPL
607638	2002 CN_{291}	—	February 10, 2002	Socorro	LINEAR	H	480 m	MPC · JPL
607639	2002 CZ_{316}	—	February 6, 2002	Anderson Mesa	LONEOS	(5)	1.3 km	MPC · JPL
607640	2002 CX_{318}	—	March 19, 2009	Kitt Peak	Spacewatch	·	750 m	MPC · JPL
607641	2002 CB_{319}	—	February 7, 2002	Palomar	NEAT	·	1.6 km	MPC · JPL
607642	2002 CS_{320}	—	March 1, 2011	Mount Lemmon	Mount Lemmon Survey	·	1 km	MPC · JPL
607643	2002 CY_{320}	—	August 8, 2016	Haleakala	Pan-STARRS 1	(5)	810 m	MPC · JPL
607644	2002 CD_{321}	—	November 4, 2013	Haleakala	Pan-STARRS 1	·	1.0 km	MPC · JPL
607645	2002 CP_{321}	—	November 7, 2005	Mauna Kea	A. Boattini	·	1.1 km	MPC · JPL
607646	2002 CE_{322}	—	September 1, 2005	Kitt Peak	Spacewatch	·	1.6 km	MPC · JPL
607647	2002 CA_{324}	—	November 27, 2010	Mount Lemmon	Mount Lemmon Survey	·	1.9 km	MPC · JPL
607648	2002 CC_{324}	—	October 19, 2012	Mount Lemmon	Mount Lemmon Survey	·	940 m	MPC · JPL
607649	2002 CJ_{324}	—	January 27, 2017	Haleakala	Pan-STARRS 1	·	1.6 km	MPC · JPL
607650	2002 CL_{324}	—	February 23, 2007	Kitt Peak	Spacewatch	H	340 m	MPC · JPL
607651	2002 CD_{325}	—	February 7, 2002	Kitt Peak	Spacewatch	·	1.1 km	MPC · JPL
607652	2002 CK_{325}	—	September 9, 2015	Haleakala	Pan-STARRS 1	·	2.1 km	MPC · JPL
607653	2002 CD_{326}	—	February 8, 2002	Kitt Peak	Deep Ecliptic Survey	L4	6.3 km	MPC · JPL
607654	2002 CS_{326}	—	September 15, 2007	Mount Lemmon	Mount Lemmon Survey	L4	5.9 km	MPC · JPL
607655	2002 CT_{326}	—	February 13, 2002	Kitt Peak	Spacewatch	·	480 m	MPC · JPL
607656	2002 CY_{327}	—	September 17, 2010	Mount Lemmon	Mount Lemmon Survey	·	1.5 km	MPC · JPL
607657	2002 CD_{328}	—	January 21, 2015	Haleakala	Pan-STARRS 1	L4	7.4 km	MPC · JPL
607658	2002 CE_{328}	—	November 17, 2014	Haleakala	Pan-STARRS 1	·	490 m	MPC · JPL
607659	2002 CR_{328}	—	August 14, 2015	Haleakala	Pan-STARRS 1	EOS	1.4 km	MPC · JPL
607660	2002 CT_{328}	—	February 14, 2002	Kitt Peak	Spacewatch	EUN	780 m	MPC · JPL
607661	2002 CU_{328}	—	February 13, 2002	Apache Point	SDSS Collaboration	·	1.8 km	MPC · JPL
607662	2002 DO_{21}	—	January 29, 2012	Kitt Peak	Spacewatch	·	590 m	MPC · JPL
607663	2002 EK_{96}	—	March 10, 2002	Kitt Peak	Spacewatch	·	1.1 km	MPC · JPL
607664	2002 EU_{111}	—	February 14, 2002	Kitt Peak	Spacewatch	·	1.3 km	MPC · JPL
607665	2002 EB_{133}	—	March 13, 2002	Socorro	LINEAR	·	1.1 km	MPC · JPL
607666	2002 ET_{139}	—	February 7, 2002	Kitt Peak	Deep Ecliptic Survey	·	1.5 km	MPC · JPL
607667	2002 EE_{150}	—	March 15, 2002	Palomar	NEAT	·	4.0 km	MPC · JPL
607668	2002 EN_{157}	—	March 18, 2002	Kitt Peak	Deep Ecliptic Survey	L4	7.1 km	MPC · JPL
607669	2002 EX_{161}	—	March 5, 2002	Apache Point	SDSS	EUN	900 m	MPC · JPL
607670	2002 EU_{164}	—	March 10, 2002	Kitt Peak	Spacewatch	·	720 m	MPC · JPL
607671	2002 EQ_{165}	—	June 7, 2016	Haleakala	Pan-STARRS 1	·	940 m	MPC · JPL
607672	2002 ED_{166}	—	November 13, 2010	Mount Lemmon	Mount Lemmon Survey	·	1.9 km	MPC · JPL
607673	2002 EJ_{166}	—	November 2, 2010	Mount Lemmon	Mount Lemmon Survey	·	1.6 km	MPC · JPL
607674	2002 EZ_{166}	—	November 21, 2006	Mount Lemmon	Mount Lemmon Survey	EOS	2.0 km	MPC · JPL
607675	2002 EB_{167}	—	January 22, 2012	Haleakala	Pan-STARRS 1	·	1.6 km	MPC · JPL
607676	2002 EO_{168}	—	March 12, 2002	Kitt Peak	Spacewatch	·	1.7 km	MPC · JPL
607677	2002 EC_{169}	—	April 12, 2002	Palomar	NEAT	·	1.6 km	MPC · JPL
607678	2002 EY_{169}	—	December 9, 2015	Mount Lemmon	Mount Lemmon Survey	·	2.7 km	MPC · JPL
607679	2002 ED_{170}	—	March 18, 2018	Haleakala	Pan-STARRS 1	·	1.8 km	MPC · JPL
607680	2002 EO_{170}	—	August 12, 2013	Haleakala	Pan-STARRS 1	·	570 m	MPC · JPL
607681	2002 EV_{170}	—	September 29, 2008	Catalina	CSS	·	1.3 km	MPC · JPL
607682	2002 EP_{172}	—	March 13, 2002	Palomar	NEAT	·	590 m	MPC · JPL
607683	2002 FU_{7}	—	March 9, 2002	Kitt Peak	Spacewatch	EOS	1.3 km	MPC · JPL
607684	2002 FU_{15}	—	March 11, 2002	Palomar	NEAT	·	3.2 km	MPC · JPL
607685	2002 FZ_{18}	—	March 18, 2002	Kitt Peak	Deep Ecliptic Survey	·	2.0 km	MPC · JPL
607686	2002 FB_{24}	—	March 18, 2002	Kitt Peak	Spacewatch	·	1.4 km	MPC · JPL
607687	2002 FA_{42}	—	March 9, 2002	Kitt Peak	Spacewatch	L4 · ERY	7.0 km	MPC · JPL
607688	2002 FQ_{42}	—	January 21, 2014	Kitt Peak	Spacewatch	·	890 m	MPC · JPL
607689	2002 FE_{44}	—	January 10, 2013	Haleakala	Pan-STARRS 1	L4	6.2 km	MPC · JPL
607690	2002 GT_{1}	—	April 5, 2002	Eskridge	G. Hug	·	2.6 km	MPC · JPL
607691	2002 GW_{5}	—	April 12, 2002	Haleakala	NEAT	·	1.4 km	MPC · JPL
607692	2002 GL_{10}	—	April 7, 2002	Bergisch Gladbach	W. Bickel	·	2.1 km	MPC · JPL
607693	2002 GQ_{29}	—	March 23, 2002	Kitt Peak	Spacewatch	·	1.7 km	MPC · JPL
607694	2002 GO_{31}	—	February 13, 2002	Kitt Peak	Spacewatch	THM	1.9 km	MPC · JPL
607695	2002 GR_{38}	—	April 2, 2002	Kitt Peak	Spacewatch	·	560 m	MPC · JPL
607696	2002 GQ_{50}	—	April 5, 2002	Palomar	NEAT	EOS	2.6 km	MPC · JPL
607697	2002 GZ_{68}	—	April 8, 2002	Palomar	NEAT	·	1.5 km	MPC · JPL
607698	2002 GP_{120}	—	April 4, 2002	Palomar	NEAT	·	680 m	MPC · JPL
607699	2002 GF_{147}	—	April 13, 2002	Palomar	NEAT	H	550 m	MPC · JPL
607700	2002 GB_{159}	—	April 14, 2002	Socorro	LINEAR	H	410 m	MPC · JPL

== 607701–607800 ==
back to top

Designation			Discovery			Properties		Ref
Permanent	Provisional	Named after	Date	Site	Discoverer(s)	Category	Diam.	Ref
607701	2002 GZ_{163}	—	April 8, 2002	Palomar	NEAT	·	2.3 km	MPC · JPL
607702	2002 GF_{169}	—	April 4, 2002	Palomar	NEAT	·	770 m	MPC · JPL
607703	2002 GK_{172}	—	April 10, 2002	Socorro	LINEAR	(5)	1.2 km	MPC · JPL
607704	2002 GN_{183}	—	April 14, 2002	Palomar	NEAT	H	480 m	MPC · JPL
607705	2002 GO_{183}	—	April 14, 2002	Palomar	NEAT	·	960 m	MPC · JPL
607706	2002 GH_{185}	—	April 9, 2002	Palomar	NEAT	·	630 m	MPC · JPL
607707	2002 GJ_{186}	—	February 26, 2007	Mount Lemmon	Mount Lemmon Survey	·	1.9 km	MPC · JPL
607708	2002 GV_{186}	—	March 5, 2006	Mount Lemmon	Mount Lemmon Survey	MIS	2.7 km	MPC · JPL
607709	2002 GC_{187}	—	April 8, 2002	Palomar	NEAT	·	750 m	MPC · JPL
607710	2002 GF_{187}	—	September 19, 2009	Catalina	CSS	·	2.6 km	MPC · JPL
607711	2002 GE_{188}	—	April 13, 2002	Palomar	NEAT	·	1.5 km	MPC · JPL
607712	2002 GN_{188}	—	April 15, 2002	Palomar	NEAT	EOS	2.6 km	MPC · JPL
607713	2002 GB_{189}	—	March 11, 2007	Kitt Peak	Spacewatch	EOS	2.0 km	MPC · JPL
607714	2002 GV_{189}	—	March 12, 2002	Kitt Peak	Spacewatch	·	780 m	MPC · JPL
607715	2002 GF_{191}	—	October 1, 2003	Kitt Peak	Spacewatch	JUN	1.1 km	MPC · JPL
607716	2002 GJ_{191}	—	February 11, 2014	Mount Lemmon	Mount Lemmon Survey	EUN	1.3 km	MPC · JPL
607717	2002 GK_{191}	—	February 9, 2010	Kitt Peak	Spacewatch	·	1.4 km	MPC · JPL
607718	2002 GP_{191}	—	August 25, 2003	Palomar	NEAT	·	1.9 km	MPC · JPL
607719	2002 GF_{192}	—	November 3, 2007	Kitt Peak	Spacewatch	·	760 m	MPC · JPL
607720	2002 GG_{192}	—	April 8, 2002	Kitt Peak	Spacewatch	·	660 m	MPC · JPL
607721	2002 GR_{192}	—	May 20, 2015	Haleakala	Pan-STARRS 1	·	1.4 km	MPC · JPL
607722	2002 GU_{192}	—	May 27, 2014	Haleakala	Pan-STARRS 1	·	3.1 km	MPC · JPL
607723	2002 GW_{192}	—	April 11, 2002	Palomar	NEAT	·	2.5 km	MPC · JPL
607724	2002 GC_{193}	—	August 28, 2014	Haleakala	Pan-STARRS 1	·	2.4 km	MPC · JPL
607725	2002 GH_{193}	—	October 20, 2012	Kitt Peak	Spacewatch	MAR	1.2 km	MPC · JPL
607726	2002 GA_{194}	—	October 11, 2012	Mount Lemmon	Mount Lemmon Survey	·	1.0 km	MPC · JPL
607727	2002 GD_{194}	—	July 25, 2008	Mount Lemmon	Mount Lemmon Survey	·	2.2 km	MPC · JPL
607728	2002 GF_{194}	—	May 8, 2013	Ka-Dar	Gerke, V.	·	2.7 km	MPC · JPL
607729	2002 GR_{194}	—	April 6, 2002	Kitt Peak	Spacewatch	·	640 m	MPC · JPL
607730	2002 GX_{195}	—	April 4, 2016	Haleakala	Pan-STARRS 1	PHO	640 m	MPC · JPL
607731	2002 GC_{196}	—	June 27, 2014	Haleakala	Pan-STARRS 1	·	2.5 km	MPC · JPL
607732	2002 GQ_{196}	—	April 4, 2002	Kitt Peak	Spacewatch	·	660 m	MPC · JPL
607733	2002 GE_{197}	—	September 27, 2014	Mount Lemmon	Mount Lemmon Survey	·	1.6 km	MPC · JPL
607734	2002 GL_{197}	—	October 10, 2016	Haleakala	Pan-STARRS 1	·	1.4 km	MPC · JPL
607735	2002 GB_{198}	—	April 7, 2002	Cerro Tololo	Deep Ecliptic Survey	EOS	1.3 km	MPC · JPL
607736	2002 HS_{18}	—	July 29, 2013	La Sagra	OAM	·	2.2 km	MPC · JPL
607737	2002 JZ_{5}	—	May 5, 2002	Palomar	NEAT	·	1.4 km	MPC · JPL
607738	2002 JD_{14}	—	May 7, 2002	Palomar	NEAT	·	2.5 km	MPC · JPL
607739	2002 JL_{21}	—	May 4, 2002	Kitt Peak	Spacewatch	·	790 m	MPC · JPL
607740	2002 JH_{110}	—	May 11, 2002	Socorro	LINEAR	·	4.2 km	MPC · JPL
607741	2002 JE_{125}	—	May 7, 2002	Palomar	NEAT	EUN	1.3 km	MPC · JPL
607742	2002 JZ_{136}	—	April 12, 2002	Kitt Peak	Spacewatch	MAR	1.3 km	MPC · JPL
607743	2002 JM_{138}	—	May 6, 2002	Kitt Peak	Spacewatch	·	600 m	MPC · JPL
607744	2002 JF_{151}	—	February 16, 2010	Mount Lemmon	Mount Lemmon Survey	·	1.4 km	MPC · JPL
607745	2002 JM_{151}	—	September 23, 2003	Palomar	NEAT	·	2.7 km	MPC · JPL
607746	2002 JU_{151}	—	April 30, 2009	Kitt Peak	Spacewatch	·	810 m	MPC · JPL
607747	2002 JW_{151}	—	August 16, 2014	Haleakala	Pan-STARRS 1	·	3.7 km	MPC · JPL
607748	2002 JB_{152}	—	August 16, 2014	Haleakala	Pan-STARRS 1	·	2.9 km	MPC · JPL
607749	2002 JD_{152}	—	October 9, 2016	Haleakala	Pan-STARRS 1	·	1.6 km	MPC · JPL
607750	2002 JH_{152}	—	May 8, 2002	Kitt Peak	Spacewatch	·	1.0 km	MPC · JPL
607751	2002 JZ_{152}	—	May 8, 2002	Kitt Peak	Spacewatch	·	1.2 km	MPC · JPL
607752	2002 JE_{153}	—	December 22, 2008	Kitt Peak	Spacewatch	EUN	1.2 km	MPC · JPL
607753	2002 JF_{153}	—	August 29, 2009	Kitt Peak	Spacewatch	HYG	2.6 km	MPC · JPL
607754	2002 JM_{153}	—	October 29, 2017	Haleakala	Pan-STARRS 1	·	1.1 km	MPC · JPL
607755	2002 JX_{153}	—	October 19, 2003	Kitt Peak	Spacewatch	·	750 m	MPC · JPL
607756	2002 KG_{11}	—	May 17, 2002	Kitt Peak	Spacewatch	·	2.9 km	MPC · JPL
607757	2002 KB_{12}	—	May 17, 2002	Palomar	NEAT	NYS	1.0 km	MPC · JPL
607758	2002 KZ_{15}	—	June 15, 2002	Kitt Peak	Spacewatch	BAR	1.0 km	MPC · JPL
607759	2002 KY_{16}	—	February 24, 2006	Catalina	CSS	·	2.0 km	MPC · JPL
607760	2002 KB_{17}	—	May 14, 2008	Mount Lemmon	Mount Lemmon Survey	·	3.4 km	MPC · JPL
607761	2002 KR_{17}	—	July 24, 2015	Haleakala	Pan-STARRS 1	(194)	1.4 km	MPC · JPL
607762	2002 LU_{6}	—	June 6, 2002	Socorro	LINEAR	·	1.4 km	MPC · JPL
607763	2002 LN_{24}	—	June 3, 2002	Palomar	NEAT	·	1.0 km	MPC · JPL
607764	2002 LC_{46}	—	June 10, 2002	Socorro	LINEAR	·	6.0 km	MPC · JPL
607765	2002 LW_{63}	—	June 14, 2002	Kitt Peak	Spacewatch	·	2.0 km	MPC · JPL
607766	2002 LZ_{64}	—	March 23, 2006	Mount Lemmon	Mount Lemmon Survey	·	1.8 km	MPC · JPL
607767	2002 LM_{65}	—	September 26, 2014	Catalina	CSS	·	3.0 km	MPC · JPL
607768	2002 LP_{65}	—	January 9, 2014	Haleakala	Pan-STARRS 1	·	2.2 km	MPC · JPL
607769	2002 LU_{65}	—	June 2, 2013	Mount Lemmon	Mount Lemmon Survey	·	2.4 km	MPC · JPL
607770	2002 LB_{66}	—	April 12, 2013	Haleakala	Pan-STARRS 1	·	2.4 km	MPC · JPL
607771	2002 MV_{6}	—	January 8, 2006	Mount Lemmon	Mount Lemmon Survey	LIX	3.5 km	MPC · JPL
607772	2002 ME_{7}	—	December 21, 2008	Mount Lemmon	Mount Lemmon Survey	EUN	1.1 km	MPC · JPL
607773	2002 MK_{7}	—	January 28, 2006	Mount Lemmon	Mount Lemmon Survey	·	3.5 km	MPC · JPL
607774	2002 MV_{7}	—	April 26, 2007	Mount Lemmon	Mount Lemmon Survey	·	2.7 km	MPC · JPL
607775	2002 MW_{7}	—	August 5, 2002	Palomar	NEAT	EUP	3.0 km	MPC · JPL
607776	2002 MK_{8}	—	October 11, 2007	Mount Lemmon	Mount Lemmon Survey	·	1.4 km	MPC · JPL
607777	2002 MN_{8}	—	June 17, 2002	Palomar	NEAT	T_{j} (2.97)	2.9 km	MPC · JPL
607778	2002 NL_{11}	—	July 4, 2002	Palomar	NEAT	·	1.5 km	MPC · JPL
607779	2002 NW_{11}	—	June 12, 2002	Palomar	NEAT	PHO	1.1 km	MPC · JPL
607780	2002 NE_{46}	—	July 13, 2002	Palomar	NEAT	·	700 m	MPC · JPL
607781	2002 NQ_{58}	—	July 3, 2002	Palomar	NEAT	·	1.4 km	MPC · JPL
607782	2002 NM_{60}	—	July 9, 2002	Palomar	NEAT	V	680 m	MPC · JPL
607783	2002 NL_{63}	—	July 9, 2002	Palomar	NEAT	·	980 m	MPC · JPL
607784	2002 NM_{63}	—	July 9, 2002	Palomar	NEAT	·	900 m	MPC · JPL
607785	2002 NZ_{70}	—	July 9, 2002	Palomar	NEAT	·	2.2 km	MPC · JPL
607786	2002 NP_{72}	—	July 12, 2002	Palomar	NEAT	·	1.8 km	MPC · JPL
607787	2002 NJ_{73}	—	April 2, 2009	Mount Lemmon	Mount Lemmon Survey	NYS	810 m	MPC · JPL
607788	2002 NT_{73}	—	July 12, 2002	Palomar	NEAT	BAP	1.2 km	MPC · JPL
607789	2002 NZ_{76}	—	February 1, 2008	Kitt Peak	Spacewatch	·	750 m	MPC · JPL
607790	2002 NB_{77}	—	October 9, 2007	Kitt Peak	Spacewatch	·	1.6 km	MPC · JPL
607791	2002 NK_{78}	—	June 6, 2002	Kitt Peak	Spacewatch	·	2.8 km	MPC · JPL
607792	2002 NX_{79}	—	January 30, 2008	Mount Lemmon	Mount Lemmon Survey	·	1.1 km	MPC · JPL
607793	2002 NR_{81}	—	August 13, 2013	Kitt Peak	Spacewatch	NYS	970 m	MPC · JPL
607794	2002 NU_{81}	—	December 22, 2008	Mount Lemmon	Mount Lemmon Survey	·	1.8 km	MPC · JPL
607795	2002 NM_{82}	—	December 19, 2003	Socorro	LINEAR	HNS	1.5 km	MPC · JPL
607796	2002 NK_{83}	—	December 27, 2003	Kitt Peak	Spacewatch	·	1.9 km	MPC · JPL
607797	2002 NN_{83}	—	July 6, 2013	Haleakala	Pan-STARRS 1	(5651)	3.1 km	MPC · JPL
607798	2002 NQ_{83}	—	February 13, 2012	Haleakala	Pan-STARRS 1	·	1.2 km	MPC · JPL
607799	2002 NR_{83}	—	March 17, 2010	Kitt Peak	Spacewatch	·	1.6 km	MPC · JPL
607800	2002 NB_{84}	—	February 12, 2011	Mount Lemmon	Mount Lemmon Survey	·	2.8 km	MPC · JPL

== 607801–607900 ==
back to top

Designation			Discovery			Properties		Ref
Permanent	Provisional	Named after	Date	Site	Discoverer(s)	Category	Diam.	Ref
607801	2002 OG_{5}	—	July 20, 2002	Palomar	NEAT	·	820 m	MPC · JPL
607802	2002 OS_{7}	—	July 18, 2002	Palomar	NEAT	T_{j} (2.99) · EUP	3.5 km	MPC · JPL
607803	2002 OH_{13}	—	July 18, 2002	Socorro	LINEAR	·	2.2 km	MPC · JPL
607804	2002 OO_{32}	—	August 11, 2002	Palomar	NEAT	·	990 m	MPC · JPL
607805	2002 OQ_{34}	—	January 3, 2009	Mount Lemmon	Mount Lemmon Survey	·	1.8 km	MPC · JPL
607806	2002 OS_{35}	—	July 21, 2002	Palomar	NEAT	·	1.8 km	MPC · JPL
607807	2002 OS_{37}	—	October 14, 2007	Catalina	CSS	·	1.8 km	MPC · JPL
607808	2002 OQ_{38}	—	October 12, 2006	Palomar	NEAT	·	1.1 km	MPC · JPL
607809	2002 PG_{1}	—	August 1, 2002	Socorro	LINEAR	PHO	1.2 km	MPC · JPL
607810	2002 PN_{8}	—	August 5, 2002	Palomar	NEAT	VER	3.0 km	MPC · JPL
607811	2002 PM_{38}	—	August 6, 2002	Palomar	NEAT	·	1.5 km	MPC · JPL
607812	2002 PK_{52}	—	August 8, 2002	Palomar	NEAT	·	960 m	MPC · JPL
607813	2002 PA_{80}	—	August 4, 2002	Palomar	NEAT	·	1.2 km	MPC · JPL
607814	2002 PO_{81}	—	August 4, 2002	Palomar	NEAT	·	2.0 km	MPC · JPL
607815	2002 PY_{106}	—	July 20, 2002	Palomar	NEAT	EUN	1.3 km	MPC · JPL
607816	2002 PF_{144}	—	August 9, 2002	Cerro Tololo	Deep Ecliptic Survey	·	2.2 km	MPC · JPL
607817	2002 PB_{150}	—	August 11, 2002	Cerro Tololo	Deep Ecliptic Survey	·	540 m	MPC · JPL
607818	2002 PR_{150}	—	August 11, 2002	Palomar	NEAT	·	1.6 km	MPC · JPL
607819	2002 PO_{166}	—	August 13, 2002	Palomar	NEAT	·	810 m	MPC · JPL
607820	2002 PO_{172}	—	August 15, 2002	Palomar	NEAT	·	1.7 km	MPC · JPL
607821	2002 PV_{180}	—	August 15, 2002	Palomar	NEAT	·	3.4 km	MPC · JPL
607822	2002 PN_{181}	—	October 3, 2006	Mount Lemmon	Mount Lemmon Survey	·	1 km	MPC · JPL
607823	2002 PM_{183}	—	August 11, 2002	Palomar	NEAT	MAS	510 m	MPC · JPL
607824	2002 PO_{183}	—	August 11, 2002	Palomar	NEAT	·	1.5 km	MPC · JPL
607825	2002 PV_{186}	—	August 11, 2002	Palomar	NEAT	·	1.4 km	MPC · JPL
607826	2002 PZ_{188}	—	August 7, 2002	Palomar	NEAT	·	800 m	MPC · JPL
607827	2002 PL_{189}	—	August 5, 2002	Palomar	NEAT	·	3.7 km	MPC · JPL
607828	2002 PM_{190}	—	February 11, 2008	Kitt Peak	Spacewatch	·	1.1 km	MPC · JPL
607829	2002 PO_{191}	—	December 14, 2004	Campo Imperatore	CINEOS	·	3.6 km	MPC · JPL
607830	2002 PT_{191}	—	August 8, 2002	Palomar	NEAT	·	1.4 km	MPC · JPL
607831	2002 PV_{191}	—	August 15, 2002	Palomar	NEAT	·	1.9 km	MPC · JPL
607832	2002 PW_{191}	—	August 15, 2002	Palomar	NEAT	HYG	2.5 km	MPC · JPL
607833	2002 PE_{194}	—	November 16, 2006	Mount Lemmon	Mount Lemmon Survey	·	1.1 km	MPC · JPL
607834	2002 PJ_{194}	—	August 12, 2002	Haleakala	NEAT	·	3.7 km	MPC · JPL
607835	2002 PS_{194}	—	September 14, 2007	Mount Lemmon	Mount Lemmon Survey	·	1.6 km	MPC · JPL
607836	2002 PG_{195}	—	September 25, 2008	Mount Lemmon	Mount Lemmon Survey	·	2.9 km	MPC · JPL
607837	2002 PK_{195}	—	February 3, 2001	Kitt Peak	Spacewatch	·	1.6 km	MPC · JPL
607838	2002 PA_{196}	—	October 17, 2006	Kitt Peak	Spacewatch	·	860 m	MPC · JPL
607839	2002 PC_{196}	—	January 18, 2005	Kitt Peak	Spacewatch	·	1.6 km	MPC · JPL
607840	2002 PR_{196}	—	August 11, 2002	Palomar	NEAT	·	4.6 km	MPC · JPL
607841	2002 PD_{198}	—	March 5, 2009	Siding Spring	SSS	H	650 m	MPC · JPL
607842	2002 PV_{199}	—	December 2, 2005	Kitt Peak	Wasserman, L. H., Millis, R. L.	VER	2.9 km	MPC · JPL
607843	2002 PC_{201}	—	October 22, 2009	Mount Lemmon	Mount Lemmon Survey	·	3.2 km	MPC · JPL
607844	2002 PS_{201}	—	April 24, 2012	Mount Lemmon	Mount Lemmon Survey	URS	3.4 km	MPC · JPL
607845	2002 PF_{203}	—	June 8, 2013	Mount Lemmon	Mount Lemmon Survey	·	3.3 km	MPC · JPL
607846	2002 PR_{203}	—	January 19, 2004	Kitt Peak	Spacewatch	V	670 m	MPC · JPL
607847	2002 PD_{204}	—	January 12, 2011	Kitt Peak	Spacewatch	·	3.2 km	MPC · JPL
607848	2002 PE_{204}	—	October 29, 2016	Mount Lemmon	Mount Lemmon Survey	·	1.9 km	MPC · JPL
607849	2002 PF_{204}	—	August 4, 2002	Palomar	NEAT	·	1.9 km	MPC · JPL
607850	2002 PP_{204}	—	June 12, 2011	Mount Lemmon	Mount Lemmon Survey	·	1.7 km	MPC · JPL
607851	2002 PD_{205}	—	August 3, 2002	Palomar	NEAT	MAR	1.1 km	MPC · JPL
607852	2002 QF_{13}	—	August 18, 2002	Palomar	NEAT	GEF	1.1 km	MPC · JPL
607853	2002 QE_{27}	—	August 28, 2002	Palomar	NEAT	·	1.4 km	MPC · JPL
607854	2002 QB_{35}	—	August 29, 2002	Palomar	NEAT	·	2.1 km	MPC · JPL
607855	2002 QD_{50}	—	August 29, 2002	Palomar	Matson, R. D.	·	1.6 km	MPC · JPL
607856	2002 QD_{51}	—	August 28, 2002	Palomar	Matson, R. D.	·	3.6 km	MPC · JPL
607857	2002 QF_{51}	—	September 6, 2002	Socorro	LINEAR	·	1.1 km	MPC · JPL
607858	2002 QN_{56}	—	August 29, 2002	Palomar	NEAT	·	3.2 km	MPC · JPL
607859	2002 QA_{67}	—	August 19, 2002	Palomar	NEAT	·	2.1 km	MPC · JPL
607860	2002 QE_{67}	—	August 26, 2002	Palomar	NEAT	·	2.7 km	MPC · JPL
607861	2002 QL_{76}	—	August 26, 2002	Palomar	NEAT	·	860 m	MPC · JPL
607862	2002 QJ_{80}	—	August 19, 2002	Palomar	NEAT	·	2.7 km	MPC · JPL
607863	2002 QP_{80}	—	August 30, 2002	Palomar	NEAT	·	3.6 km	MPC · JPL
607864	2002 QT_{80}	—	August 19, 2002	Palomar	NEAT	HNS	1.2 km	MPC · JPL
607865	2002 QF_{88}	—	August 27, 2002	Palomar	NEAT	·	1.2 km	MPC · JPL
607866	2002 QB_{97}	—	December 3, 2005	Mauna Kea	A. Boattini	VER	2.3 km	MPC · JPL
607867	2002 QP_{98}	—	August 30, 2002	Palomar	NEAT	·	3.6 km	MPC · JPL
607868	2002 QV_{100}	—	August 18, 2002	Palomar	NEAT	VER	2.4 km	MPC · JPL
607869	2002 QP_{104}	—	August 26, 2002	Palomar	NEAT	·	780 m	MPC · JPL
607870	2002 QM_{106}	—	August 30, 2002	Palomar	NEAT	V	520 m	MPC · JPL
607871	2002 QC_{108}	—	August 27, 2002	Palomar	NEAT	·	1.6 km	MPC · JPL
607872	2002 QX_{109}	—	August 17, 2002	Palomar	NEAT	·	2.8 km	MPC · JPL
607873	2002 QS_{110}	—	July 6, 2002	Kitt Peak	Spacewatch	·	3.1 km	MPC · JPL
607874	2002 QA_{111}	—	August 17, 2002	Palomar	NEAT	·	2.9 km	MPC · JPL
607875	2002 QS_{111}	—	August 18, 2002	Palomar	NEAT	VER	2.3 km	MPC · JPL
607876	2002 QD_{120}	—	February 25, 2006	Mount Lemmon	Mount Lemmon Survey	·	3.0 km	MPC · JPL
607877	2002 QA_{124}	—	August 17, 2002	Palomar	NEAT	·	2.9 km	MPC · JPL
607878	2002 QX_{124}	—	July 7, 2002	Kitt Peak	Spacewatch	DOR	1.8 km	MPC · JPL
607879	2002 QZ_{124}	—	August 17, 2002	Palomar	NEAT	·	670 m	MPC · JPL
607880	2002 QP_{125}	—	August 29, 2002	Palomar	NEAT	V	550 m	MPC · JPL
607881	2002 QB_{127}	—	August 27, 2002	Palomar	NEAT	·	2.9 km	MPC · JPL
607882	2002 QA_{128}	—	August 18, 2002	Palomar	NEAT	·	2.3 km	MPC · JPL
607883	2002 QH_{130}	—	August 30, 2002	Palomar	NEAT	MRX	830 m	MPC · JPL
607884	2002 QB_{132}	—	August 30, 2002	Palomar	NEAT	·	3.2 km	MPC · JPL
607885	2002 QA_{140}	—	August 17, 2002	Palomar	NEAT	·	1.6 km	MPC · JPL
607886	2002 QV_{140}	—	August 16, 2002	Palomar	NEAT	·	1.6 km	MPC · JPL
607887	2002 QF_{142}	—	November 2, 2007	Kitt Peak	Spacewatch	·	1.5 km	MPC · JPL
607888	2002 QG_{142}	—	February 7, 2008	Mount Lemmon	Mount Lemmon Survey	·	970 m	MPC · JPL
607889	2002 QO_{142}	—	October 20, 2007	Mount Lemmon	Mount Lemmon Survey	·	1.4 km	MPC · JPL
607890	2002 QJ_{144}	—	August 18, 2002	Palomar	NEAT	NYS	710 m	MPC · JPL
607891	2002 QS_{147}	—	August 30, 2002	Palomar	NEAT	·	790 m	MPC · JPL
607892	2002 QX_{147}	—	August 30, 2002	Palomar	NEAT	·	2.9 km	MPC · JPL
607893	2002 QZ_{147}	—	February 9, 2008	Mount Lemmon	Mount Lemmon Survey	(2076)	710 m	MPC · JPL
607894	2002 QH_{148}	—	August 19, 2002	Palomar	NEAT	·	1.3 km	MPC · JPL
607895	2002 QX_{148}	—	October 10, 2007	Kitt Peak	Spacewatch	·	1.6 km	MPC · JPL
607896	2002 QF_{149}	—	October 15, 2007	Kitt Peak	Spacewatch	·	1.5 km	MPC · JPL
607897	2002 QS_{149}	—	July 30, 2008	Kitt Peak	Spacewatch	·	2.8 km	MPC · JPL
607898	2002 QM_{150}	—	July 21, 2006	Mount Lemmon	Mount Lemmon Survey	·	1.2 km	MPC · JPL
607899	2002 QY_{151}	—	January 18, 2009	Kitt Peak	Spacewatch	·	1.6 km	MPC · JPL
607900	2002 QB_{152}	—	August 28, 2002	Palomar	NEAT	·	2.9 km	MPC · JPL

== 607901–608000 ==
back to top

Designation			Discovery			Properties		Ref
Permanent	Provisional	Named after	Date	Site	Discoverer(s)	Category	Diam.	Ref
607901	2002 QL_{152}	—	October 12, 2007	Mount Lemmon	Mount Lemmon Survey	NEM	2.3 km	MPC · JPL
607902	2002 QB_{153}	—	October 16, 2006	Catalina	CSS	·	1.3 km	MPC · JPL
607903	2002 QC_{153}	—	October 22, 2006	Catalina	CSS	·	1.2 km	MPC · JPL
607904	2002 QC_{155}	—	September 16, 2002	Palomar	NEAT	·	1.6 km	MPC · JPL
607905	2002 QF_{155}	—	October 8, 2008	Mount Lemmon	Mount Lemmon Survey	·	3.1 km	MPC · JPL
607906	2002 QU_{156}	—	December 21, 2008	Kitt Peak	Spacewatch	EUN	1.5 km	MPC · JPL
607907	2002 QE_{157}	—	April 16, 2001	Kitt Peak	Spacewatch	EOS	2.0 km	MPC · JPL
607908	2002 QA_{158}	—	June 16, 1998	Kitt Peak	Spacewatch	·	1.1 km	MPC · JPL
607909	2002 QO_{158}	—	February 4, 2009	Mount Lemmon	Mount Lemmon Survey	·	1.7 km	MPC · JPL
607910	2002 QK_{159}	—	June 5, 2018	Haleakala	Pan-STARRS 1	VER	2.3 km	MPC · JPL
607911	2002 QZ_{159}	—	October 21, 2014	Kitt Peak	Spacewatch	VER	2.2 km	MPC · JPL
607912	2002 RO_{4}	—	September 19, 2011	Catalina	CSS	·	1.8 km	MPC · JPL
607913	2002 RL_{124}	—	August 15, 2002	Anderson Mesa	LONEOS	·	1.4 km	MPC · JPL
607914	2002 RO_{127}	—	September 3, 2002	Palomar	NEAT	·	2.0 km	MPC · JPL
607915	2002 RV_{146}	—	September 11, 2002	Palomar	NEAT	·	940 m	MPC · JPL
607916	2002 RU_{147}	—	September 11, 2002	Palomar	NEAT	·	3.7 km	MPC · JPL
607917	2002 RR_{156}	—	September 6, 2002	Socorro	LINEAR	·	3.7 km	MPC · JPL
607918	2002 RQ_{157}	—	September 11, 2002	Palomar	NEAT	·	1.7 km	MPC · JPL
607919	2002 RQ_{167}	—	September 13, 2002	Palomar	NEAT	·	1.0 km	MPC · JPL
607920	2002 RX_{167}	—	September 13, 2002	Palomar	NEAT	·	1.2 km	MPC · JPL
607921	2002 RC_{168}	—	September 13, 2002	Palomar	NEAT	·	1.8 km	MPC · JPL
607922	2002 RN_{184}	—	September 12, 2002	Palomar	NEAT	H	450 m	MPC · JPL
607923	2002 RW_{194}	—	September 5, 2002	Socorro	LINEAR	·	1.7 km	MPC · JPL
607924	2002 RY_{194}	—	September 6, 2002	Socorro	LINEAR	·	3.4 km	MPC · JPL
607925	2002 RL_{204}	—	September 5, 2002	Socorro	LINEAR	·	1.9 km	MPC · JPL
607926	2002 RV_{209}	—	September 15, 2002	Kitt Peak	Spacewatch	NEM	1.8 km	MPC · JPL
607927	2002 RS_{212}	—	May 4, 2005	Kitt Peak	Spacewatch	·	1.5 km	MPC · JPL
607928	2002 RX_{221}	—	September 15, 2002	Palomar	NEAT	·	1.5 km	MPC · JPL
607929	2002 RF_{237}	—	September 15, 2002	Palomar	Matson, R. D.	·	1.7 km	MPC · JPL
607930	2002 RG_{240}	—	August 29, 2002	Palomar	NEAT	526	2.0 km	MPC · JPL
607931	2002 RF_{241}	—	September 14, 2002	Palomar	Matson, R. D.	·	950 m	MPC · JPL
607932	2002 RK_{248}	—	October 9, 2002	Kitt Peak	Spacewatch	·	820 m	MPC · JPL
607933	2002 RO_{258}	—	September 12, 2002	Palomar	NEAT	MAS	580 m	MPC · JPL
607934	2002 RK_{260}	—	October 9, 2002	Kitt Peak	Spacewatch	AGN	890 m	MPC · JPL
607935	2002 RP_{260}	—	September 15, 2002	Palomar	NEAT	·	1.5 km	MPC · JPL
607936	2002 RC_{262}	—	September 13, 2002	Palomar	NEAT	·	3.2 km	MPC · JPL
607937	2002 RW_{262}	—	September 13, 2002	Palomar	NEAT	HYG	2.7 km	MPC · JPL
607938	2002 RY_{265}	—	October 10, 2002	Apache Point	SDSS Collaboration	MRX	810 m	MPC · JPL
607939	2002 RR_{266}	—	September 5, 2002	Apache Point	SDSS	·	1.5 km	MPC · JPL
607940	2002 RH_{268}	—	September 4, 2002	Palomar	NEAT	·	1.6 km	MPC · JPL
607941	2002 RA_{269}	—	September 4, 2002	Palomar	NEAT	·	2.8 km	MPC · JPL
607942	2002 RN_{270}	—	September 4, 2002	Palomar	NEAT	·	1.6 km	MPC · JPL
607943	2002 RJ_{271}	—	March 11, 2005	Mount Lemmon	Mount Lemmon Survey	·	3.0 km	MPC · JPL
607944	2002 RG_{277}	—	September 14, 2002	Palomar	NEAT	·	2.7 km	MPC · JPL
607945	2002 RG_{280}	—	September 14, 2002	Palomar	NEAT	·	1.4 km	MPC · JPL
607946	2002 RF_{282}	—	August 12, 2002	Cerro Tololo	Deep Ecliptic Survey	EUN	1.4 km	MPC · JPL
607947	2002 RA_{283}	—	August 18, 2006	Kitt Peak	Spacewatch	·	1.2 km	MPC · JPL
607948	2002 RL_{283}	—	October 10, 2007	Mount Lemmon	Mount Lemmon Survey	·	1.7 km	MPC · JPL
607949	2002 RS_{285}	—	January 28, 2006	Catalina	CSS	T_{j} (2.99)	3.8 km	MPC · JPL
607950	2002 RQ_{288}	—	September 30, 2006	Mount Lemmon	Mount Lemmon Survey	MAS	560 m	MPC · JPL
607951	2002 RB_{289}	—	September 14, 2002	Palomar	NEAT	·	1.3 km	MPC · JPL
607952	2002 RF_{289}	—	September 14, 2002	Palomar	NEAT	·	2.1 km	MPC · JPL
607953	2002 RD_{293}	—	September 29, 2011	Kitt Peak	Spacewatch	MAR	1.3 km	MPC · JPL
607954	2002 RN_{293}	—	October 18, 2007	Kitt Peak	Spacewatch	·	1.6 km	MPC · JPL
607955	2002 RY_{294}	—	February 4, 2011	Catalina	CSS	PHO	740 m	MPC · JPL
607956	2002 RS_{295}	—	November 4, 2007	Kitt Peak	Spacewatch	·	1.5 km	MPC · JPL
607957	2002 RU_{295}	—	September 14, 2002	Haleakala	NEAT	·	1.1 km	MPC · JPL
607958	2002 RY_{295}	—	June 29, 2011	Kitt Peak	Spacewatch	·	2.0 km	MPC · JPL
607959	2002 RT_{296}	—	October 10, 2007	Kitt Peak	Spacewatch	WIT	890 m	MPC · JPL
607960	2002 RL_{297}	—	February 1, 2009	Kitt Peak	Spacewatch	·	1.9 km	MPC · JPL
607961	2002 RO_{297}	—	December 22, 2003	Kitt Peak	Spacewatch	HOF	2.5 km	MPC · JPL
607962	2002 RX_{297}	—	September 23, 2008	Kitt Peak	Spacewatch	·	3.2 km	MPC · JPL
607963	2002 RK_{298}	—	September 30, 2006	Mount Lemmon	Mount Lemmon Survey	·	790 m	MPC · JPL
607964	2002 RO_{298}	—	August 14, 2013	Haleakala	Pan-STARRS 1	·	880 m	MPC · JPL
607965	2002 RT_{298}	—	November 8, 2007	Mount Lemmon	Mount Lemmon Survey	·	1.5 km	MPC · JPL
607966	2002 RU_{298}	—	December 31, 2008	Mount Lemmon	Mount Lemmon Survey	H	390 m	MPC · JPL
607967	2002 RY_{298}	—	August 27, 2011	Haleakala	Pan-STARRS 1	·	1.3 km	MPC · JPL
607968	2002 RA_{299}	—	August 8, 2013	Haleakala	Pan-STARRS 1	·	840 m	MPC · JPL
607969	2002 RE_{299}	—	September 13, 2002	Palomar	NEAT	·	1.5 km	MPC · JPL
607970	2002 RO_{299}	—	October 20, 2017	Mount Lemmon	Mount Lemmon Survey	·	990 m	MPC · JPL
607971	2002 RE_{300}	—	October 23, 2006	Mount Lemmon	Mount Lemmon Survey	·	910 m	MPC · JPL
607972	2002 RQ_{300}	—	October 12, 2007	Mount Lemmon	Mount Lemmon Survey	WIT	800 m	MPC · JPL
607973	2002 RF_{301}	—	February 7, 2006	Kitt Peak	Spacewatch	THB	2.3 km	MPC · JPL
607974	2002 SG_{4}	—	September 27, 2002	Palomar	NEAT	H	470 m	MPC · JPL
607975	2002 SH_{7}	—	September 27, 2002	Palomar	NEAT	·	1.3 km	MPC · JPL
607976	2002 SX_{10}	—	September 27, 2002	Palomar	NEAT	NYS	1.0 km	MPC · JPL
607977	2002 SQ_{12}	—	September 27, 2002	Palomar	NEAT	·	1.2 km	MPC · JPL
607978	2002 SR_{35}	—	September 29, 2002	Haleakala	NEAT	·	1.5 km	MPC · JPL
607979	2002 SH_{65}	—	September 28, 2002	Palomar	NEAT	·	2.2 km	MPC · JPL
607980	2002 SQ_{72}	—	October 19, 2007	Kitt Peak	Spacewatch	·	1.4 km	MPC · JPL
607981	2002 SG_{75}	—	September 19, 2011	Catalina	CSS	·	2.3 km	MPC · JPL
607982	2002 TV_{10}	—	October 2, 2002	Socorro	LINEAR	H	490 m	MPC · JPL
607983	2002 TH_{62}	—	October 3, 2002	Campo Imperatore	CINEOS	·	1.8 km	MPC · JPL
607984	2002 TG_{73}	—	October 3, 2002	Palomar	NEAT	·	4.5 km	MPC · JPL
607985	2002 TV_{89}	—	October 3, 2002	Palomar	NEAT	·	1.3 km	MPC · JPL
607986	2002 TX_{94}	—	October 3, 2002	Socorro	LINEAR	·	1 km	MPC · JPL
607987	2002 TZ_{94}	—	October 3, 2002	Socorro	LINEAR	·	1.5 km	MPC · JPL
607988	2002 TE_{98}	—	October 3, 2002	Socorro	LINEAR	PHO	800 m	MPC · JPL
607989	2002 TA_{114}	—	September 3, 2002	Palomar	NEAT	·	1.5 km	MPC · JPL
607990	2002 TG_{114}	—	October 3, 2002	Palomar	NEAT	·	1.8 km	MPC · JPL
607991	2002 TH_{116}	—	September 10, 2002	Haleakala	NEAT	·	2.1 km	MPC · JPL
607992	2002 TG_{135}	—	October 4, 2002	Palomar	NEAT	·	1.7 km	MPC · JPL
607993	2002 TS_{147}	—	October 4, 2002	Palomar	NEAT	·	1.8 km	MPC · JPL
607994	2002 TG_{150}	—	October 5, 2002	Palomar	NEAT	·	1.1 km	MPC · JPL
607995	2002 TX_{150}	—	October 5, 2002	Palomar	NEAT	HYG	2.7 km	MPC · JPL
607996	2002 TX_{159}	—	October 5, 2002	Palomar	NEAT	·	2.5 km	MPC · JPL
607997	2002 TQ_{212}	—	September 30, 2002	Haleakala	NEAT	·	1.8 km	MPC · JPL
607998	2002 TT_{235}	—	October 6, 2002	Socorro	LINEAR	H	520 m	MPC · JPL
607999	2002 TH_{258}	—	October 9, 2002	Socorro	LINEAR	·	2.6 km	MPC · JPL
608000	2002 TO_{374}	—	October 8, 2002	Palomar	NEAT	·	1.8 km	MPC · JPL

back to top

== Meaning of names ==
As minor planet discoveries are confirmed, they are given a permanent number by the IAU's Minor Planet Center (MPC), and the discoverers can then submit names for them, following the IAU's naming conventions. The list below concerns those minor planets in the specified number-range that have received names, and explains the meanings of those names.

Official naming citations of newly named small Solar System bodies are approved and published in a bulletin by IAU's Working Group for Small Bodies Nomenclature (WGSBN). Before May 2021, citations were published in MPC's Minor Planet Circulars for many decades. Recent citations can also be found on the JPL Small-Body Database (SBDB). Until his death in 2016, German astronomer Lutz D. Schmadel compiled these citations into the Dictionary of Minor Planet Names (DMP) and regularly updated the collection.

Based on Paul Herget's The Names of the Minor Planets, Schmadel also researched the unclear origin of numerous asteroids, most of which had been named prior to World War II. This article incorporates text from this source, which is in the public domain: SBDB New namings may only be added to this list below after official publication as the preannouncement of names is condemned. The WGSBN publishes a comprehensive guideline for the naming rules of non-cometary small Solar System bodies.

Named minor planet	Provisional	This minor planet was named for...	Ref · Catalog
607372 Colombounilanka	2000 WU_{178}	The University of Colombo is the oldest institution of modern higher education in Sri Lanka.	IAU · 607372
