= List of UGC objects (1-1000) =

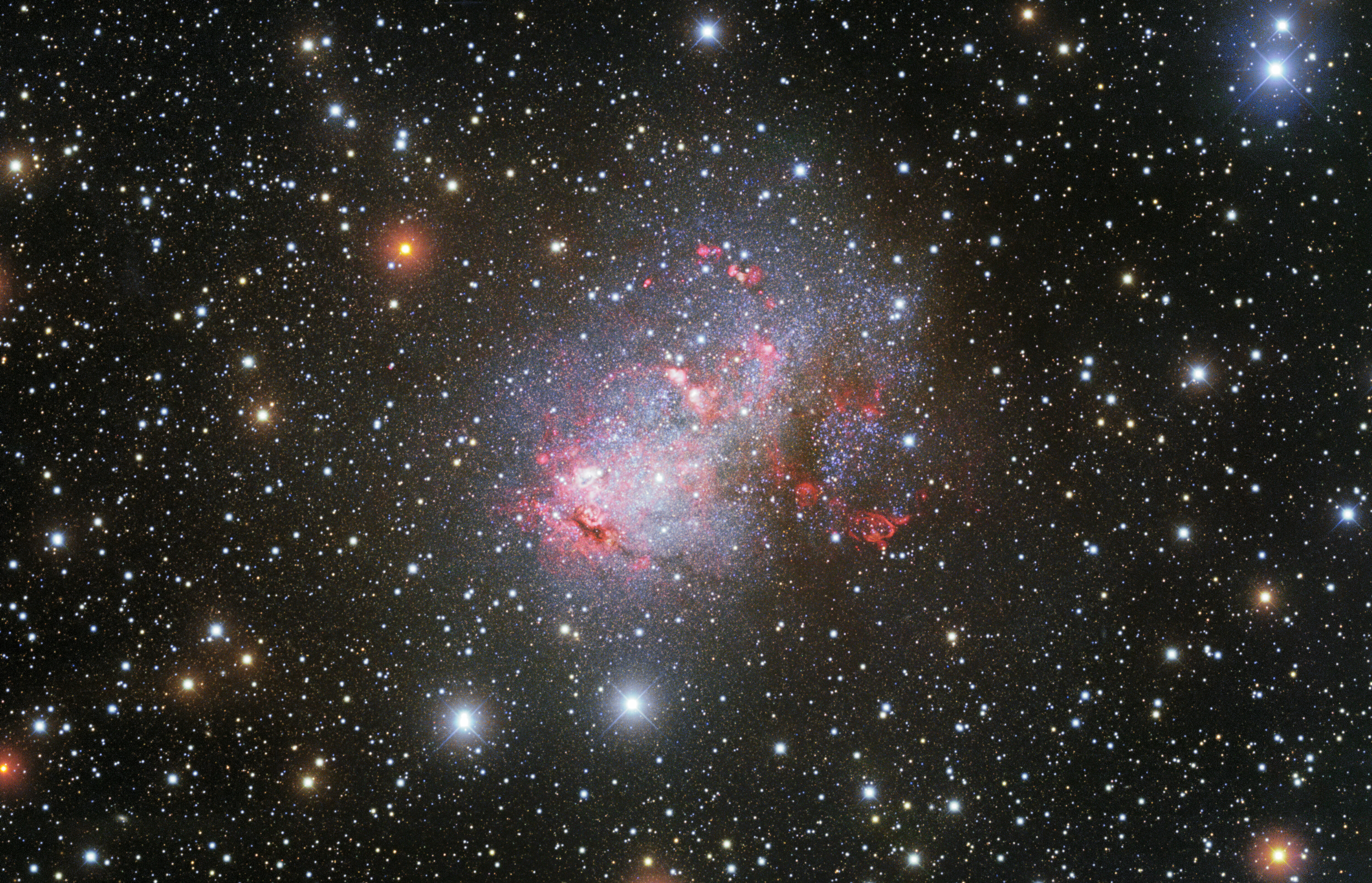
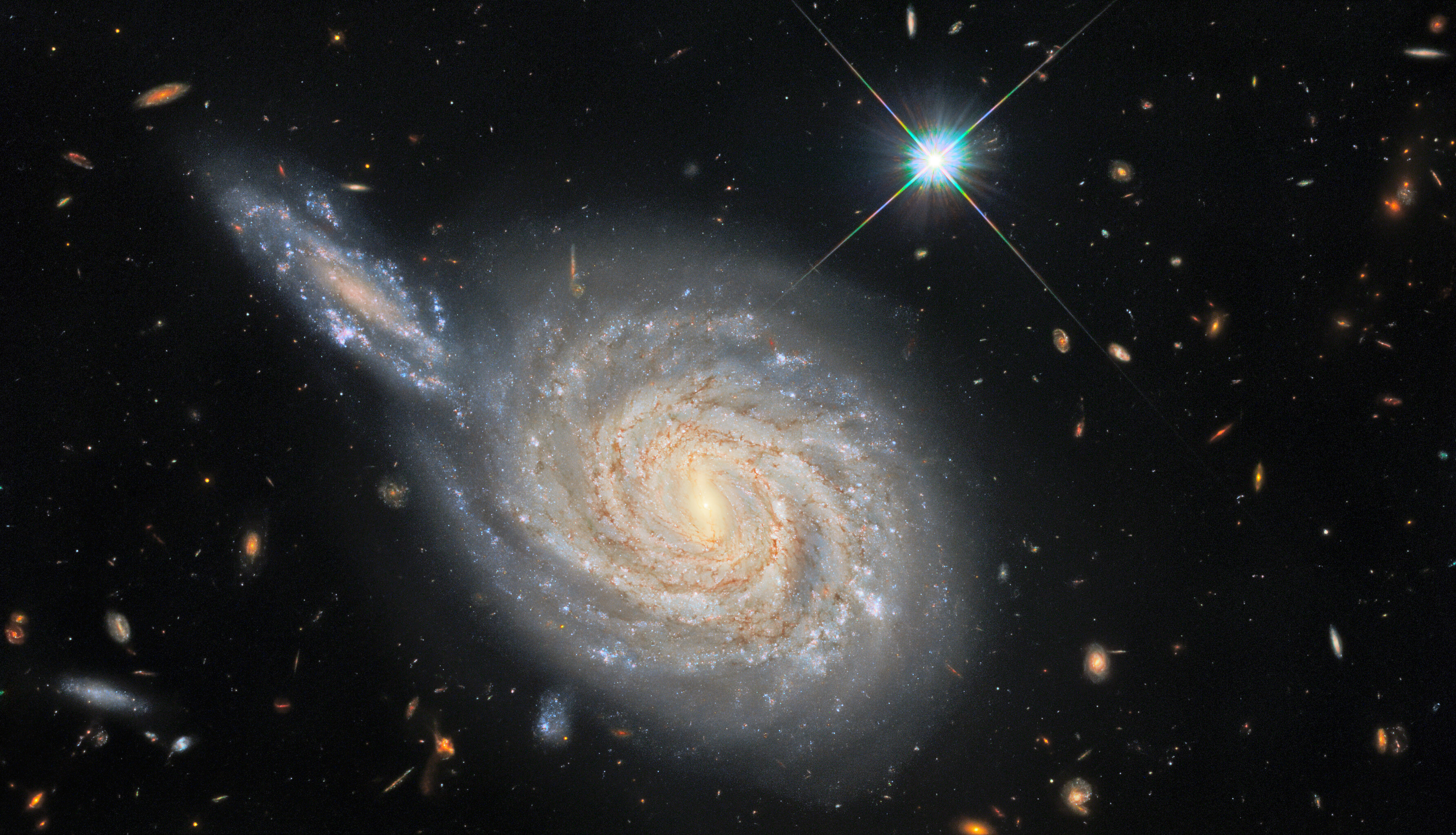
Images of galaxies present in the list

This is a list of UGC objects from the Uppsala General Catalogue (UGC). The astronomical catalogue is composed mainly of star clusters, and galaxies.

Galaxy morphological types and objects are identified using the NASA/IPAC Extragalactic Database. The other data of these tables are from the SIMBAD Astronomical Database unless otherwise stated.

== 1–100 ==
UGC number	Other names	Image	Object type	Constellation	Right ascension Declination (J2000)	Apparent magnitude
1	IC 5378					
7	IC 5381					
8	NGC 7814		Spiral galaxy	Pegasus	00^{h} 03^{m} 14.9103^{s} 16° 08′ 43.11″	11.6
16	NGC 7816		Spiral galaxy	Pisces	00^{h} 03^{m} 48.8^{s} 07° 28′ 43″	13.61
19	NGC 7817		Spiral galaxy	Pisces		
21	NGC 7818		Spiral galaxy	Pisces		
26	NGC 7819			Pegasus		
57	NGC 1		Spiral galaxy	Pisces	00^{h} 07^{m} 15.8672^{s} 27° 42′ 28.911″	13.6
58	NGC 3		Lenticular galaxy	Pisces	00^{h} 07^{m} 16.8^{s} 08° 18′ 06″	14.2
59	NGC 2		Spiral galaxy	Pisces	00^{h} 07^{m} 17.1^{s} 27° 40′ 42″	15.0
60	NGC 7831			Andromeda		
62	NGC 5			Andromeda		
65	NGC 7836		Spiral galaxy	Andromeda	00^{h} 08^{m} 1.6^{s} 33° 04′ 15″	14.4
73	NGC 11		Spiral galaxy	Andromeda	00^{h} 08^{m} 42.5^{s} 37° 26′ 52″	14.5
74	NGC 12		Spiral galaxy	Pisces	00^{h} 08^{m} 44.752^{s} 04° 36′ 45.12″	13.84
75	NGC 14		Irregular galaxy	Pegasus	00^{h} 08^{m} 46.4^{s} 15° 48′ 59″	12.71
77	NGC 13		Spiral galaxy	Andromeda		
78	NGC 19		Spiral galaxy	Pegasus	00^{h} 08^{m} 54.7^{s} 23° 49′ 01″	14.35
80	NGC 16		Lenticular galaxy	Pegasus	00^{h} 09^{m} 04.3^{s} 27° 43′ 45″	13.0
82	NGC 15		Spiral galaxy	Pegasus	00^{h} 09^{m} 02.5^{s} 21° 37′ 27″	14.67
84	NGC 20		Lenticular galaxy	Andromeda		
86	NGC 22		Spiral galaxy	Pegasus	00^{h} 09^{m} 48.2^{s} 27° 49′ 56″	14.4
89	NGC 23		Spiral galaxy	Pegasus	00^{h} 09^{m} 53.411^{s} 25° 55′ 25.46″	11.9
94	NGC 26		Spiral galaxy	Pegasus	00^{h} 10^{m} 25.8591^{s} 25° 49′ 54.982″	13.6
96	NGC 27		Spiral galaxy	Andromeda		
98	NGC 19		Spiral galaxy	Andromeda	00^{h} 10^{m} 40.8673^{s} 32° 58′ 58.633″	13.99
100	NGC 21		Spiral galaxy	Andromeda	00^{h} 10^{m} 46.9^{s} 33° 21′ 10″	12.8

== 101–200 ==
UGC number	Other names	Image	Object type	Constellation	Right ascension Declination (J2000)	Apparent magnitude
106	NGC 36		Barred spiral galaxy	Pisces		
114	NGC 39		Spiral galaxy	Andromeda	00^{h} 12^{m} 18.8525^{s} 31° 03′ 39.946″	13.92
118	NGC 42		Lenticular galaxy	Pegasus		
120	NGC 43		Lenticular galaxy	Andromeda	00^{h} 13^{m} 00.7647^{s} 30° 54′ 54.901″	13.6
123	IC 4			Pegasus		
133	NGC 48		Barred spiral galaxy	Andromeda		
136	NGC 49		Lenticular galaxy	Andromeda	00^{h} 14^{m} 22.4^{s} 48° 14′ 48″	14.1
138	NGC 51		Lenticular galaxy	Andromeda		
140	NGC 52		Spiral galaxy	Pegasus	00^{h} 14^{m} 40.2^{s} 18° 34′ 48″	14.6
145	NGC 57		Elliptical galaxy	Pegasus	00^{h} 15^{m} 30.9132^{s} 17° 19′ 42.307″	11.8
150	NGC 60		Spiral galaxy	Pisces	00^{h} 15^{m} 58.28^{s} 00° 18′ 12.7″	14.85
167	NGC 63		Spiral galaxy	Pisces	00^{h} 17^{m} 45.54685^{s} 11° 07′ 01″	12.70
170	NGC 68		Lenticular galaxy	Andromeda	00^{h} 18^{m} 18.5^{s} 30° 04′ 18″	12.9
173	NGC 71		Elliptical galaxy	Andromeda		
174	NGC 70		Spiral galaxy	Andromeda	00^{h} 18^{m} 22.55^{s} 30° 04′ 43.4″	13.5
176	NGC 72		Barred spiral galaxy	Andromeda		
182	NGC 75		Lenticular galaxy	Pisces		
185	NGC 76		Lenticular galaxy	Andromeda		
192	IC 10		Irregular galaxy	Cassiopeia	00^{h} 20^{m} 17.2917^{s} 59° 18′ 13.867″	10.4
193	NGC 78A		Spiral galaxy	Cassiopeia	00^{h} 20^{m} 27.482^{s} 00° 50′ 00.96″	14.5
194	NGC 78B		Elliptical galaxy	Cassiopeia	00^{h} 20^{m} 27.482^{s} 00° 50′ 00.96″	14.5
195	IC 13			Pisces		

== 201–300 ==
UGC number	Other names	Image	Object type	Constellation	Right ascension Declination (J2000)	Apparent magnitude
203	NGC 80		Lenticular galaxy	Andromeda	00^{h} 21^{m} 10.865^{s} +22° 21′ 26.11″	
206	NGC 83		Elliptical galaxy	Andromeda	00^{h} 21^{m} 22.399^{s} +22° 26′ 01.11″	
208	NGC 90		Spiral galaxy	Andromeda		
209	NGC 93		Spiral galaxy	Andromeda	00^{h} 22^{m} 03.211^{s} +22° 24′ 29.15″	
212	UGC 212					
214	NGC 95		Spiral galaxy	Pisces	00^{h} 22^{m} 13.6^{s} +10° 29′ 30″	
216	NGC 97		Elliptical galaxy	Andromeda		
230	NGC 99		Spiral galaxy	Pisces	00^{h} 23^{m} 59.422^{s} +15° 46′ 13.04″	
231	NGC 100		Spiral galaxy	Pisces	00^{h} 24^{m} 02.837^{s} +16° 29′ 11.00″	
241	NGC 105		Spiral galaxy	Pisces		
246	NGC 108		Barred lenticular galaxy	Andromeda		
251	NGC 109		Spiral galaxy	Andromeda		
255	NGC 112		Barred spiral galaxy	Andromeda		
259	NGC 114		Barred lenticular galaxy	Cetus		
264	NGC 118		Spiral galaxy	Cetus		
286	NGC 125		Lenticular galaxy	Pisces		
292	NGC 128		Lenticular galaxy	Pisces		

== 301–400 ==
UGC number	Other names	Image	Object type	Constellation	Right ascension Declination (J2000)	Apparent magnitude
301	NGC 132		Spiral galaxy	Cetus	00^{h} 30^{m} 10.71^{s} +02° 05′ 36.4″	12.7
308	NGC 138		Spiral galaxy	Pisces	00^{h} 30^{m} 59.24^{s} +05° 09′ 35.1″	13.7
309	NGC 137		Lenticular galaxy	Pisces	00^{h} 30^{m} 58.10^{s} +10° 12′ 30.3″	12.8
326	NGC 147		Dwarf spheroidal galaxy	Casseopeia	00^{h} 33^{m} 11.79^{s} +48° 30′ 24.8″	9.6
332	NGC 149		Lenticular galaxy	Andromeda	00^{h} 33^{m} 50.26^{s} +30° 43′ 24.3″	13.8
356	NGC 160		Lenticular galaxy	Andromeda	00^{h} 36^{m} 04.06^{s} +23° 57′ 28.4″	12.6
365	NGC 169, Arp 282		Spiral galaxy	Andromeda	00^{h} 36^{m} 51.60^{s} +23° 59′ 27.3″	12.4
369	NGC 173		Spiral galaxy	Cetus	00^{h} 37^{m} 12.47^{s} +01° 56′ 32.1″	12.3
380	NGC 180		Barred spiral galaxy	Pisces	00^{h} 37^{m} 57.70^{s} +08° 38′ 06.7″	13.0
382	NGC 182		Spiral galaxy	Pisces	00^{h} 38^{m} 12.38^{s} +02° 43′ 42.8″	12.5
387	NGC 183		Elliptical galaxy	Andromeda	00^{h} 38^{m} 29.39^{s} +29° 30′ 40.4″	12.6
390	NGC 186		Barred lenticular galaxy	Pisces	00^{h} 38^{m} 25.30^{s} +03° 09′ 59.2″	13.6
396	NGC 185		Dwarf spheroidal galaxy	Casseopeia	00^{h} 38^{m} 57.97^{s} +48° 20′ 14.6″	9.3
397	NGC 190		Interacting galaxy	Pisces	00^{h} 38^{m} 54.70^{s} +07° 03′ 35.0″	14.0

== 401–500 ==
UGC number	Other names	Image	Object type	Constellation	Right ascension Declination (J2000)	Apparent magnitude
401	NGC 192		Barred spiral galaxy	Cetus	00^{h} 39^{m} 13.39^{s} +00° 51′ 50.9″	12.6
405	NGC 196		Lenticular galaxy	Cetus	00^{h} 39^{m} 17.84^{s} +00° 54′ 45.9″	13.6
406	NGC 197		Lenticular galaxy	Cetus	00^{h} 39^{m} 18.79^{s} +00° 53′ 31.0″	13.7
407	NGC 194		Elliptical galaxy	Pisces	00^{h} 39^{m} 18.42^{s} +03° 02′ 14.8″	12.2
408	NGC 193		Elliptical galaxy	Pisces	00^{h} 39^{m} 18.59^{s} +03° 19′ 52.0″	12.4
414	NGC 198		Spiral galaxy	Pisces	00^{h} 39^{m} 22.98^{s} +02° 47′ 52.5″	12.8
415	NGC 199		Lenticular galaxy	Pisces	00^{h} 39^{m} 33.17^{s} +03° 08′ 18.7″	13.7
419	NGC 201		Barred spiral galaxy	Cetus	00^{h} 39^{m} 34.82^{s} +00° 51′ 35.6″	12.9
420	NGC 200		Barred spiral galaxy	Pisces	00^{h} 39^{m} 34.88^{s} +02° 53′ 14.8″	12.7
421	NGC 202		Spiral galaxy	Pisces	00^{h} 39^{m} 39.85^{s} +03° 32′ 10.6″	14.6
423	NGC 204		Lenticular galaxy	Pisces	00^{h} 39^{m} 44.27^{s} +03° 17′ 58.5″	13.0
426	M 110, NGC 205		Elliptical galaxy	Andromeda	00^{h} 40^{m} 22.00^{s} +41° 41′ 07.0″	8.1
436	NGC 213		Barred spiral galaxy	Pisces	00^{h} 41^{m} 10.00^{s} +16° 28′ 09.8″	13.5
438	NGC 214		Barred spiral galaxy	Andromeda	00^{h} 41^{m} 28.02^{s} +25° 29′ 57.7″	12.3
440	NGC 218		Spiral galaxy	Andromeda	00^{h} 41^{m} 44.62^{s} +36° 21′ 34.4″	14.3
450	NGC 223, IC 44		Galaxy	Cetus	00^{h} 42^{m} 15.9^{s} +00° 50′ 44″	13.4
452	M 32, NGC 221		Dwarf galaxy	Andromeda	00^{h} 42^{m} 41.90^{s} +40° 51′ 57.2″	8.1
454	Andromeda Galaxy		Spiral galaxy	Andromeda	00^{h} 42^{m} 44.31^{s} +41° 16′ 09.4″	3.4
456	NGC 227		Elliptical galaxy	Cetus	00^{h} 42^{m} 36.83^{s} −01° 31′ 43.6″	12.1
458	NGC 228		Barred spiral galaxy	Andromeda	00^{h} 42^{m} 54.51^{s} +23° 30′ 11.0″	13.9
459	NGC 226		Galaxy	Andromeda	00^{h} 42^{m} 54.04^{s} +32° 34′ 51.5″	13.4
461	NGC 237		Barred spiral galaxy	Cetus	00^{h} 43^{m} 27.87^{s} −00° 07′ 29.6″	12.9
462	NGC 236		Spiral galaxy	Pisces	00^{h} 43^{m} 27.54^{s} +02° 57′ 29.5″	13.6
464	NGC 233		Elliptical galaxy	Andromeda	00^{h} 43^{m} 36.56^{s} +30° 35′ 13.2″	12.8
473	NGC 240		Spiral galaxy	Pisces	00^{h} 45^{m} 01.93^{s} +06° 06′ 48.1″	13.7
476	NGC 245		Spiral galaxy	Cetus	00^{h} 46^{m} 05.39^{s} −01° 43′ 24.2″	12.3
487	NGC 250		Lenticular galaxy	Pisces	00^{h} 47^{m} 16.01^{s} +07° 54′ 36.1″	13.8
490	NGC 251		Spiral galaxy	Pisces	00^{h} 47^{m} 54.03^{s} +19° 35′ 48.6″	13.4
491	NGC 252		Lenticular galaxy	Andromeda	00^{h} 48^{m} 01.50^{s} +27° 37′ 25.1″	12.5
493	NGC 257		Spiral galaxy	Pisces	00^{h} 48^{m} 01.51^{s} +08° 17′ 49.5″	12.7
497	NGC 260		Spiral galaxy	Andromeda	00^{h} 48^{m} 34.65^{s} +27° 41′ 32.8″	13.6
499	NGC 262		Lenticular galaxy	Andromeda	00^{h} 48^{m} 47.14^{s} +31° 57′ 25.1″	13.1

== 501–600 ==
UGC number	Other names	Image	Object type	Constellation	Right ascension Declination (J2000)	Apparent magnitude
508	NGC 266		Barred spiral galaxy	Andromeda	00^{h} 49^{m} 47.80^{s} +32° 16′ 39.8″	11.8
519	NGC 271		Barred spiral galaxy	Cetus	00^{h} 50^{m} 41.86^{s} −01° 54′ 36.9″	12.2
528	NGC 278		Barred spiral galaxy	Casseopeia	00^{h} 52^{m} 04.31^{s} +47° 33′ 01.8″	10.7
532	NGC 279		Spiral galaxy	Cetus	00^{h} 52^{m} 08.95^{s} −02° 13′ 06.4″	12.9
534	NGC 280		Barred spiral galaxy	Andromeda	00^{h} 52^{m} 30.26^{s} +24° 21′ 02.1″	13.5
562	NGC 296		Barred spiral galaxy	Pisces	00^{h} 55^{m} 07.51^{s} +31° 32′ 32.2″	12.4
584	NGC 307		Lenticular galaxy	Cetus	00^{h} 56^{m} 32.58^{s} −01° 46′ 19.0″	12.8
592	NGC 311		Lenticular galaxy	Pisces	00^{h} 57^{m} 32.73^{s} +30° 16′ 50.7″	13.0
593	NGC 317A		Lenticular galaxy	Andromeda	00^{h} 57^{m} 39.05^{s} +43° 48′ 02.8″	13.5
594	NGC 317B		Barred spiral galaxy	Andromeda	00^{h} 57^{m} 40.45^{s} +43° 47′ 32.1″	13.1
597	NGC 315		Elliptical galaxy	Pisces	00^{h} 57^{m} 48.88^{s} +30° 21′ 08.8″	11.2

== 601–700 ==
UGC number	Other names	Image	Object type	Constellation	Right ascension Declination (J2000)	Apparent magnitude
601	NGC 326		Elliptical galaxy	Pisces	00^{h} 58^{m} 22.70^{s} +26° 51′ 55.0″	13.3
609	NGC 332		Elliptical galaxy	Pisces	00^{h} 58^{m} 49.13^{s} +07° 06′ 40.7″	13.5
624	NGC 338		Spiral galaxy	Pisces	01^{h} 00^{m} 36.41^{s} +30° 40′ 08.3″	12.9
639	NGC 351		Barred spiral galaxy	Cetus	01^{h} 01^{m} 57.84^{s} −01° 56′ 12.3″	13.2
641	NGC 353		Barred spiral galaxy	Cetus	01^{h} 02^{m} 24.53^{s} −01° 57′ 31.9″	13.7
645	NGC 354		Barred spiral galaxy	Pisces	01^{h} 03^{m} 16.39^{s} +22° 20′ 33.6″	13.5
662	NGC 359		Elliptical galaxy	Cetus	01^{h} 04^{m} 16.97^{s} −00° 45′ 53.8″	13.4
666	NGC 364		Lenticular galaxy	Cetus	01^{h} 04^{m} 40.83^{s} −00° 48′ 09.9″	13.3
668	IC 1613		Galaxy	Cetus	01^{h} 04^{m} 47.8^{s} +02° 07′ 04″	9.2
680	NGC 374		Spiral galaxy	Pisces	01^{h} 07^{m} 05.78^{s} +32° 47′ 42.4″	13.5
683	NGC 379		Lenticular galaxy	Pisces	01^{h} 07^{m} 15.69^{s} +32° 31′ 13.3″	12.9
686	NGC 384		Elliptical galaxy	Pisces	01^{h} 07^{m} 25.02^{s} +32° 17′ 34.0″	13.0
687	NGC 385		Elliptical galaxy	Pisces	01^{h} 07^{m} 27.23^{s} +32° 19′ 11.4″	13.0
688	NGC 382		Elliptical galaxy	Pisces	01^{h} 07^{m} 23.95^{s} +32° 24′ 14.4″	13.2
689	NGC 383		Elliptical galaxy	Pisces	01^{h} 07^{m} 24.96^{s} +32° 24′ 45.2″	12.2
693	NGC 391		Elliptical galaxy	Cetus	01^{h} 07^{m} 22.58^{s} +00° 55′ 33.4″	13.5
700	NGC 392		Elliptical galaxy	Pisces	01^{h} 08^{m} 23.46^{s} +33° 08′ 01.0″	12.7

== 701–800 ==
UGC number	Other names	Image	Object type	Constellation	Right ascension Declination (J2000)	Apparent magnitude
703	NGC 389		Spiral galaxy	Andromeda	01^{h} 08^{m} 29.93^{s} +39° 41′ 43.6″	14.0
707	NGC 393		Elliptical galaxy	Andromeda	01^{h} 08^{m} 36.95^{s} +39° 38′ 39.5″	12.4
712	NGC 399		Barred spiral galaxy	Pisces	01^{h} 08^{m} 59.20^{s} +32° 38′ 03.5″	13.6
715	NGC 403		Spiral galaxy	Pisces	01^{h} 09^{m} 14.16^{s} +32° 45′ 07.7″	12.5
718	Geist von Mirach, NGC 404		Lenticular galaxy	Andromeda	01^{h} 09^{m} 27^{s} +35° 43′ 04″	10.0
730	NGC 407		Spiral galaxy	Pisces	01^{h} 10^{m} 36.56^{s} +33° 07′ 35.4″	13.5
735	NGC 410		Elliptical galaxy	Pisces	01^{h} 10^{m} 58.87^{s} +33° 09′ 08.3″	11.5
744	NGC 414		Lenticular galaxy	Pisces	01^{h} 11^{m} 17.80^{s} +33° 06′ 46.0″	13.5
752	NGC 420		Lenticular galaxy	Pisces	01^{h} 12^{m} 09.65^{s} +32° 07′ 23.4″	12.2
758	NGC 425		Spiral galaxy	Andromeda	01^{h} 13^{m} 02.56^{s} +38° 46′ 06.1″	12.7
760	NGC 426		Elliptical galaxy	Cetus	01^{h} 12^{m} 48.61^{s} −00° 17′ 24.7″	12.8
762	NGC 429		Lenticular galaxy	Cetus	01^{h} 12^{m} 57.42^{s} −00° 20′ 41.9″	13.4
763	NGC 428		Barred spiral galaxy	Cetus	01^{h} 12^{m} 55.71^{s} +00° 58′ 53.6″	11.3
765	NGC 430		Elliptical galaxy	Cetus	01^{h} 12^{m} 59.93^{s} −00° 15′ 08.9″	12.5
776	NGC 431		Lenticular galaxy	Andromeda	01^{h} 14^{m} 04.66^{s} +33° 42′ 15.4″	12.9
779	NGC 435		Spiral galaxy	Cetus	01^{h} 14^{m} 00.01^{s} +02° 04′ 16.0″	14.2
788	NGC 437		Spiral galaxy	Pisces	01^{h} 14^{m} 22.37^{s} +05° 55′ 37.6″	13.0
789	NGC 442		Spiral galaxy	Cetus	01^{h} 14^{m} 38.50^{s} −01° 01′ 14.0″	13.6
796	NGC 443, IC 1653		Spiral galaxy	Pisces	01^{h} 15^{m} 07.60^{s} +33° 22′ 38.0″	13.7

== 801–900 ==
UGC number	Other names	Image	Object type	Constellation	Right ascension Declination (J2000)	Apparent magnitude
801	NGC 448		Elliptical galaxy	Cetus	01^{h} 15^{m} 16.67^{s} −01° 37′ 35.3″	12.2
804	NGC 447, IC 1656		Barred spiral galaxy	Pisces	01^{h} 15^{m} 37.74^{s} +33° 04′ 04.1″	13.6
806	NGC 450		Spiral galaxy	Cetus	01^{h} 15^{m} 31.00^{s} −00° 51′ 37.0″	
807	PGC 4545		Spiral galaxy	Cetus	01^{h} 15^{m} 35.0^{s} −00° 50′ 52″	
810	NGC 444, IC 1658		Spiral galaxy	Pisces	01^{h} 15^{m} 49.73^{s} +31° 04′ 49.5″	14.2
815	NGC 455		Lenticular galaxy	Pisces	01^{h} 15^{m} 57.74^{s} +05° 10′ 42.3″	12.6
818	NGC 446, IC 89		Lenticular galaxy	Pisces	01^{h} 16^{m} 03.70^{s} +04° 17′ 38.0″	12.8
820	NGC 452		Barred spiral galaxy	Pisces	01^{h} 16^{m} 14.96^{s} +31° 02′ 00.7″	13.5
832	NGC 459		Spiral galaxy	Pisces	01^{h} 18^{m} 08.27^{s} +17° 33′ 43.5″	14.7
840	NGC 463		Spiral galaxy	Pisces	01^{h} 18^{m} 58.19^{s} +16° 19′ 32″	14.2
848	NGC 467		Lenticular galaxy	Pisces	01^{h} 18^{m} 10.20^{s} +03° 18′ 02.3″	12.1
858	NGC 470, Arp 227		Spiral galaxy	Pisces	01^{h} 19^{m} 44.95^{s} +03° 24′ 35.3″	11.7
859	NGC 473		Barred spiral galaxy	Pisces	01^{h} 18^{m} 55.07^{s} +16° 32′ 40.7″	12.4
861	NGC 471		Lenticular galaxy	Pisces	01^{h} 19^{m} 59.62^{s} +14° 47′ 10.7″	13.2
864	NGC 474		Lenticular galaxy	Pisces	01^{h} 20^{m} 06.78^{s} +03° 24′ 55.6″	11.3
870	NGC 472		Spiral galaxy	Pisces	01^{h} 20^{m} 28.68^{s} +32° 42′ 32.3″	13.1
886	NGC 477		Barred spiral galaxy	Andromeda	01^{h} 21^{m} 20.39^{s} +40° 29′ 17.6″	13.1
893	NGC 479		Spiral galaxy	Pisces	01^{h} 21^{m} 15.87^{s} +03° 51′ 43.6″	14.0
895	NGC 485		Spiral galaxy	Pisces	01^{h} 21^{m} 27.60^{s} +07° 01′ 07.0″	13.2

== 901-1000 ==
UGC number	Other names	Image	Object type	Constellation	Right ascension Declination (J2000)	Apparent magnitude
906	NGC 483		Spiral galaxy	Pisces	01^{h} 21^{m} 56.41^{s} +33° 31′ 15.6″	13.2
907	NGC 488		Spiral galaxy	Pisces	01^{h} 21^{m} 47^{s} +05° 15′ 18″	10.3
908	NGC 489		Spiral galaxy	Pisces	01^{h} 21^{m} 53.96^{s} +09° 12′ 24.3″	12.6
914	NGC 493		Barred spiral galaxy	Cetus	01^{h} 22^{m} 09.54^{s} +00° 56′ 47.5″	12.2
915	NGC 497, Arp 8		Barred spiral galaxy	Cetus	01^{h} 22^{m} 23.77^{s} −00° 52′ 30.7″	13.0
919	NGC 494		Spiral galaxy	Pisces	01^{h} 22^{m} 55.36^{s} +33° 10′ 25.8″	13.0
920	NGC 495		Barred spiral galaxy	Pisces	01^{h} 22^{m} 56.06^{s} +33° 28′ 17.1″	13.0
922	NGC 502		Lenticular galaxy	Pisces	01^{h} 22^{m} 55.67^{s} +09° 02′ 56.5″	12.7
924	NGC 505		Lenticular galaxy	Pisces	01^{h} 22^{m} 57.18^{s} +08° 28′ 08.1″	14.0
926	NGC 499, IC 1686		Elliptical galaxy	Pisces	01^{h} 23^{m} 11.53^{s} +33° 27′ 37.9″	12.2
927	NGC 496		Spiral galaxy	Pisces	01^{h} 23^{m} 11.50^{s} +33° 31′ 39″	13.4
935	NGC 504		Lenticular galaxy	Pisces	01^{h} 23^{m} 27.98^{s} +33° 12′ 15.5″	13.0
936	NGC 511		Elliptical galaxy	Pisces	01^{h} 23^{m} 30.81^{s} +11° 17′ 26.7″	13.9
938	NGC 507		Elliptical galaxy	Pisces	01^{h} 23^{m} 40.00^{s} +33° 15′ 21.9″	11.3
939	NGC 508		Elliptical galaxy	Pisces	01^{h} 23^{m} 40.63^{s} +33° 16′ 50.1″	13.1
944	NGC 512		Spiral galaxy	Andromeda	01^{h} 23^{m} 59.91^{s} +33° 54′ 28.7″	13.3
946	NGC 516		Barred spiral galaxy	Pisces	01^{h} 24^{m} 08.12^{s} +09° 33′ 05.5″	13.3
947	NGC 514		Spiral galaxy	Pisces	01^{h} 24^{m} 04.01^{s} +12° 55′ 01.9″	12.2
952	NGC 518		Spiral galaxy	Pisces	01^{h} 24^{m} 17.84^{s} +09° 19′ 51.4″	13.4
953	NGC 513		Spiral galaxy	Andromeda	01^{h} 24^{m} 26.89^{s} +33° 47′ 57.3″	12.9
956	NGC 515		Lenticular galaxy	Pisces	01^{h} 24^{m} 38.59^{s} +33° 28′ 22.2″	13.1
960	NGC 517		Lenticular galaxy	Pisces	01^{h} 24^{m} 43.91^{s} +33° 25′ 46.8″	12.5
962	NGC 521		Spiral galaxy	Cetus	01^{h} 24^{m} 33.82^{s} +01° 43′ 52.0″	11.7
965	NGC 530, IC 106		Spiral galaxy	Cetus	01^{h} 24^{m} 41.64^{s} −01° 35′ 13.4″	13.1
966	NGC 520, Arp 157		Spiral galaxy	Pisces	01^{h} 24^{m} 34.80^{s} +03° 47′ 29.9″	11.3
968	NGC 524		Galaxy	Pisces	01^{h} 24^{m} 47.72^{s} +09° 32′ 19.8″	10.3
970	NGC 522		Spiral galaxy	Pisces	01^{h} 24^{m} 45.92^{s} +09° 59′ 41.2″	13.2
972	NGC 525		Lenticular galaxy	Pisces	01^{h} 24^{m} 53.01^{s} +09° 42′ 11.4″	13.3
979	NGC 523, NGC 537		Spiral galaxy	Andromeda	01^{h} 25^{m} 20.87^{s} +34° 01′ 29.3″	12.7
982	NGC 532		Spiral galaxy	Pisces	01^{h} 25^{m} 17.34^{s} +09° 15′ 50.8″	13.1
988	NGC 528		Lenticular galaxy	Andromeda	01^{h} 25^{m} 33.61^{s} +33° 40′ 16.4″	12.6
991	NGC 538		Spiral galaxy	Cetus	01^{h} 25^{m} 26.03^{s} −01° 33′ 02.2″	13.8
992	NGC 533		Elliptical galaxy	Cetus	01^{h} 25^{m} 31.36^{s} +01° 45′ 32.8″	11.4
995	NGC 529		Elliptical galaxy	Andromeda	01^{h} 25^{m} 40.43^{s} +34° 42′ 46.1″	12.2
997	NGC 535		Spiral galaxy	Cetus	01^{h} 25^{m} 31.17^{s} −01° 24′ 29.9″	14.0

== See also ==
- UGC
- Uppsala General Catalogue
- galaxy
- Lists of astronomical objects
- List of NGC objects
- List of IC objects
