= NGC 57 =

Galaxy in the constellation Pisces

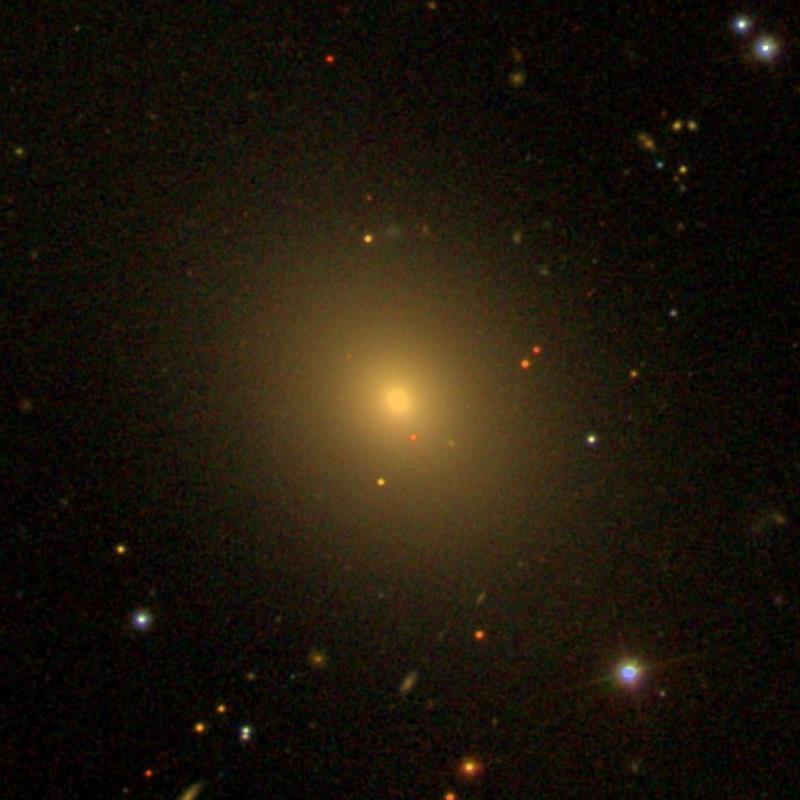
- NGC 57 imaged by SDSS

Observation data (J2000 epoch)
- Constellation: Pisces
- Right ascension: 00^{h} 15^{m} 30.9132^{s}
- Declination: +17° 19′ 42.307″
- Redshift: 0.018146
- Heliocentric radial velocity: 5,440 ± 22 km/s
- Distance: 243 Mly
- Apparent magnitude (V): 11.8
- Apparent magnitude (B): 12.8

Characteristics
- Type: E
- Apparent size (V): 2.2′ × 1.9′

Other designations
- UGC 145, MCG +03-01-031, PGC 1037, CGCG 456-046

NGC 57 is an elliptical galaxy in the constellation Pisces. It was discovered by German-British astronomer William Herschel on 8 October 1784.

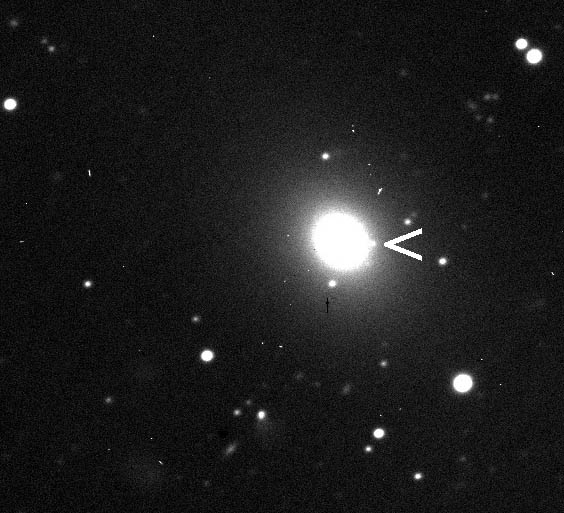
SN 2010dq imaged on 3 September 2010

== Supernovae ==
Two supernovae have been observed in NGC 57:

- SN 2010dq (Type Ia, mag. 17.3) was discovered by Kōichi Itagaki on 3 June 2010. It was 17" west and 1" south of the center of NGC 57 at coordinates 00^{h} 15^{m} 29.70^{s}, +17° 19′ 41.0″.
- SN 2011fp (Type Ia, mag. 17.9) was discovered by Kōichi Itagaki on 29 August 2011.

== See also ==
- List of NGC objects (1–1000)

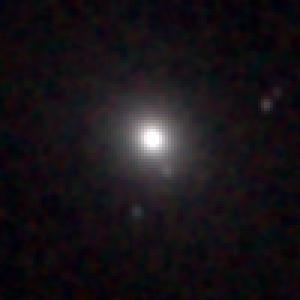
NGC 57 (2MASS)
