= NGC 138 =

Spiral galaxy in the constellation Pisces

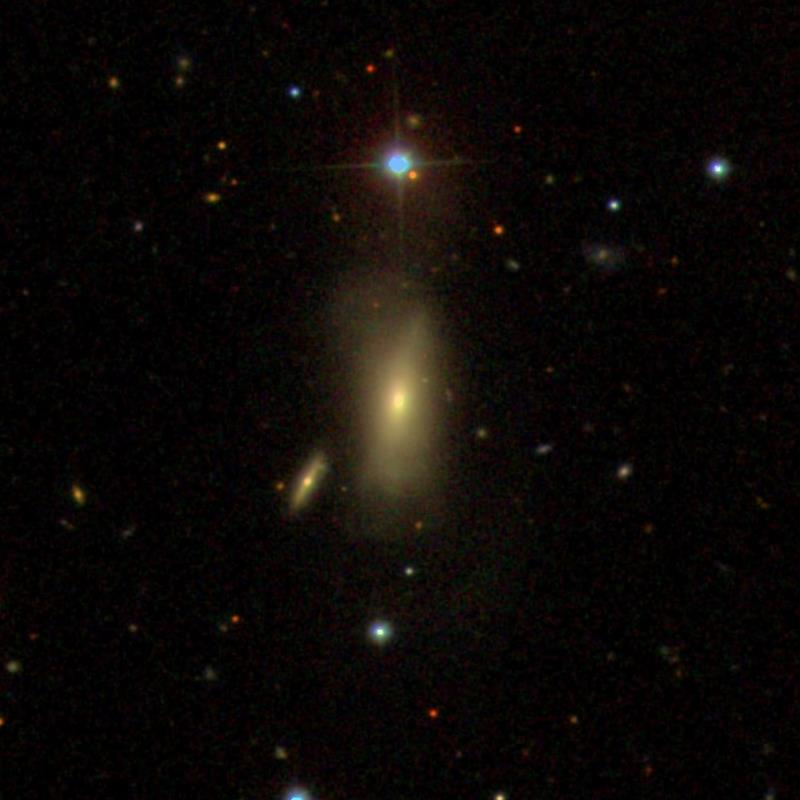
- SDSS image of NGC 138

Observation data (J2000.0 epoch)
- Constellation: Pisces
- Right ascension: 00^{h} 30^{m} 59.2^{s}
- Declination: ±05° 09′ 35″
- Redshift: 0.039674
- Heliocentric radial velocity: 11894 ± 31
- Galactocentric velocity: 12001 ± 31
- Apparent magnitude (B): 14,8

Characteristics
- Type: Sa

Other designations
- UGC 00308, CGCG 409-023, CGCG 0028.4+0454, MCG +01-02-016, 2MASX J00305921+0509350, GALEXASC J003059.34+050934.0, GALEXMSC J003059.35+050933.4, WBL 011-002, PGC 001889, UZC J003059.3+050935

NGC 138 is a spiral galaxy in the constellation Pisces. It was discovered on August 29, 1864, by Albert Marth.

== Supernova ==
One supernova has been observed in NGC 138:

- SN 2023lfo (Type Ia, mag. 17.26) was discovered by Pan-STARRS on 19 June 2023.

== Image gallery ==
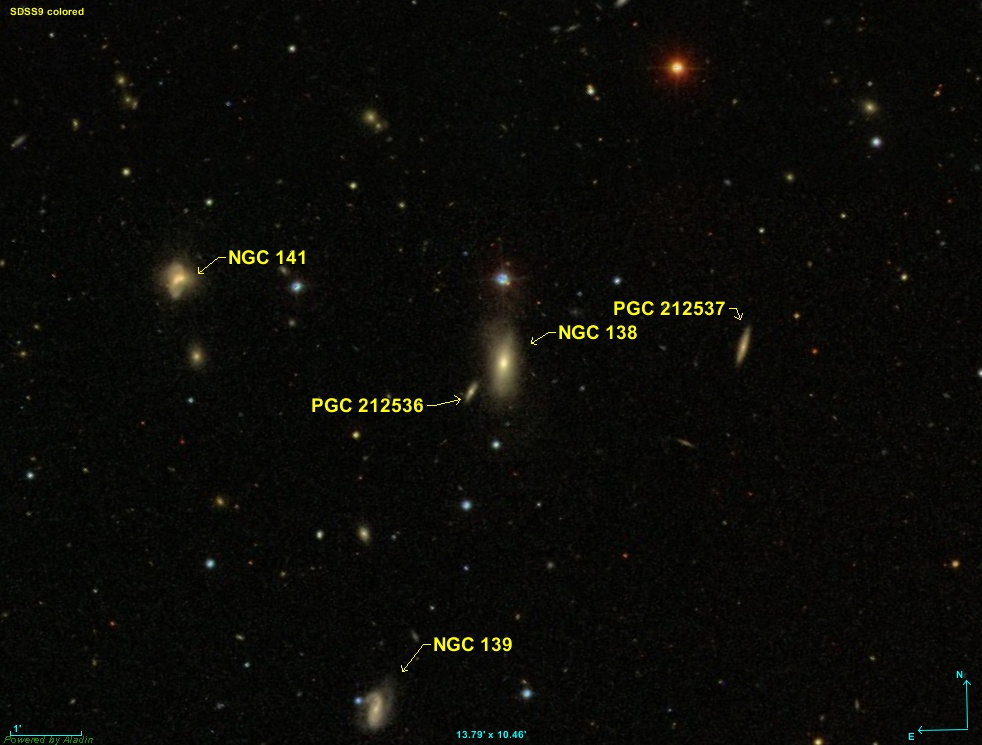
Wide angle image of NGC 138 (SDSS)
