= NGC 160 =

Lenticular galaxy in Andromeda

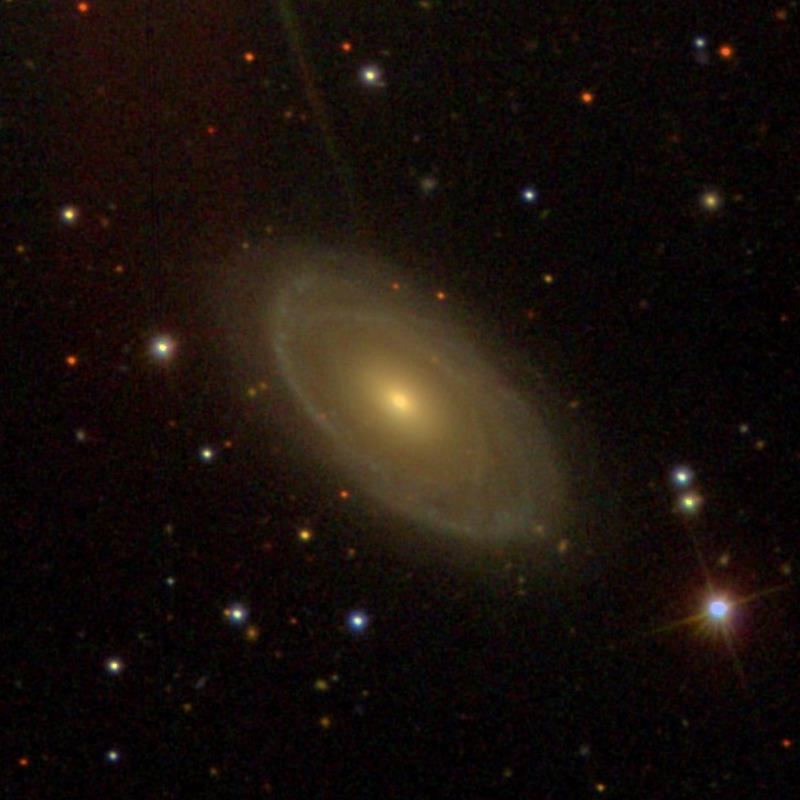
- SDSS image of NGC 160

Observation data (J2000 epoch)
- Constellation: Andromeda
- Right ascension: 00^{h} 36^{m} 04.048^{s}
- Declination: +23° 57′ 28.37″
- Redshift: 0.017525
- Heliocentric radial velocity: 5254
- Distance: 233.20 ± 38.28 Mly (71.500 ± 11.738 Mpc)
- Apparent magnitude (V): 13.7
- Apparent magnitude (B): 12.65

Characteristics
- Type: (R)SA0^{+} pec
- Size: 204,000 ly (62,400 pc) (Note: POSS1 103a-O values used.)
- Apparent size (V): 3.0′ × 1.7′

Other designations
- UGC 356, MCG+04-02-033, PGC 2154

NGC 160 is a lenticular galaxy in the constellation Andromeda. It was discovered on December 5, 1785, by William Herschel.
