= NGC 477 =

Galaxy in the constellation Andromeda

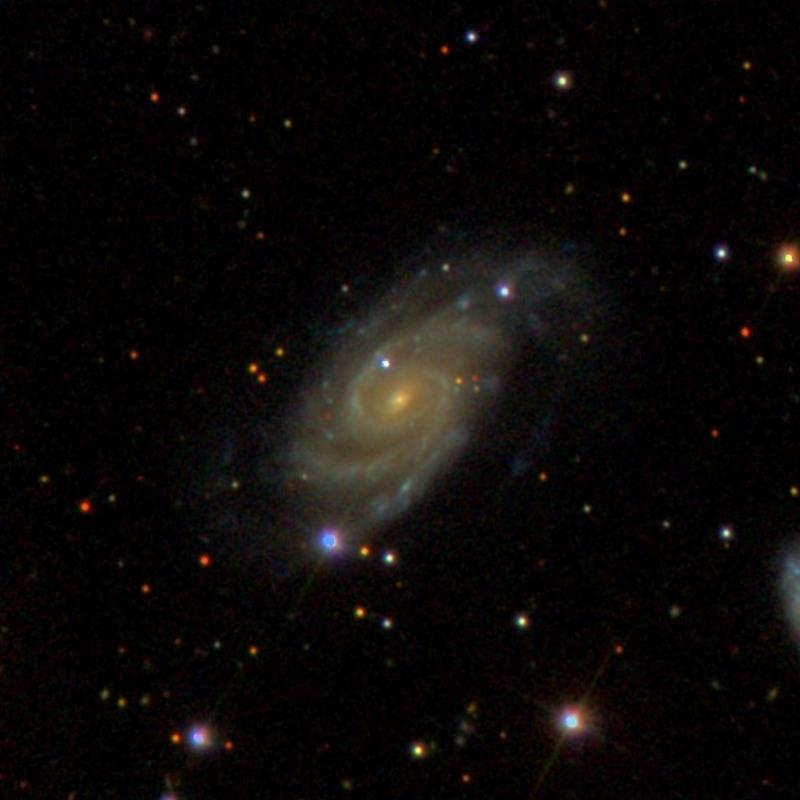
- SDSS view of NGC 477

Observation data (J2000 epoch)
- Constellation: Andromeda
- Right ascension: 01^{h} 21^{m} 20.39^{s}
- Declination: +40° 29′ 17.6″
- Redshift: 0.019560 ± 0.000033
- Heliocentric radial velocity: 5807 ± 10 km/s
- Distance: 250 Mly
- Apparent magnitude (V): 13.1

Characteristics
- Type: SAB(s)c
- Apparent size (V): 1,6′ × 1,1′

Other designations
- PGC 4915, GC 268, UGC 886, MCG +07-03-032 2MASX J01212039+4029176

NGC 477 is a spiral galaxy in the constellation Andromeda. It is located approximately 250 million light-years from Earth and was discovered on October 18, 1786 by astronomer William Herschel.

== Supernova ==
One supernova has been observed in NGC 477:

- SN 2002jy (Type Ia, mag. 16.3) was discovered by Ron Arbour and Tonny Vanmunster on 17 December 2002.

== See also ==
- Spiral galaxy
- List of NGC objects (1–1000)
