= NGC 240 =

Lenticular or spiral galaxy in the constellation Pisces

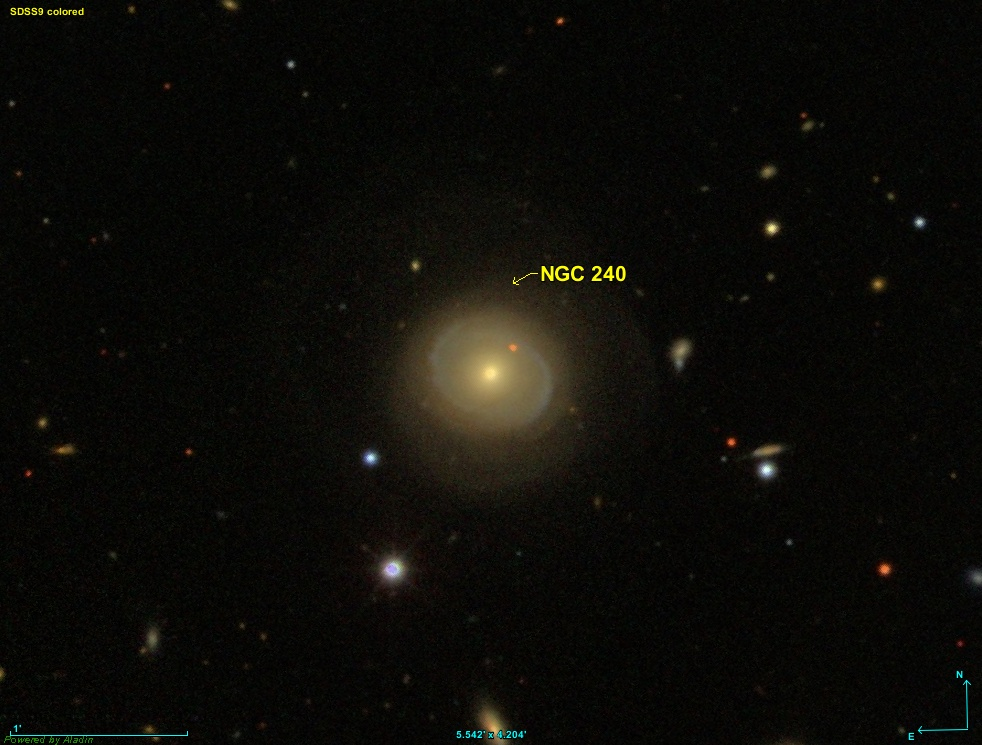

Observation data (J2000 epoch)
- Constellation: Pisces
- Right ascension: 00^{h} 45^{m} 01.9^{s}
- Declination: +06° 06′ 48″
- Redshift: 0.040825
- Apparent magnitude (V): 14.49

Characteristics
- Type: S0/a
- Apparent size (V): 1.0' × 0.9'

Other designations
- UGC 00473, CGCG 410-003, MCG +01-03-001, 2MASX J00450192+0606482, PGC 2653.

NGC 240 is a lenticular or spiral galaxy located in the constellation Pisces. It was discovered on October 22, 1886 by Lewis Swift.
