= NGC 180 =

Galaxy in the constellation Pisces

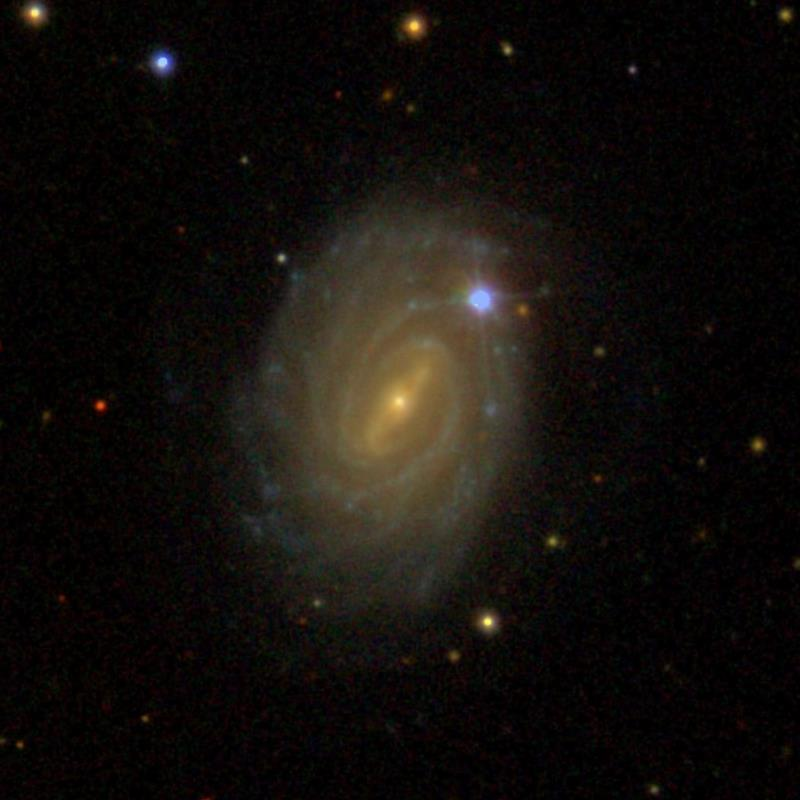
- SDSS image of NGC 180

Observation data (J2000 epoch)
- Constellation: Pisces
- Right ascension: 00^{h} 37^{m} 57.7^{s}
- Declination: +08° 38′ 07″
- Redshift: 0.017616
- Distance: 213.89 ± 11.41 Mly (65.580 ± 3.498 Mpc)
- Apparent magnitude (V): 13.70

Characteristics
- Type: SB(rs)bc
- Apparent size (V): 2.2' × 0.5'

Other designations
- UGC 380, CGCG 409-050, MCG +01-02-039, 2MASX J00375769+0838068, IRAS 00353+0821, PGC 2268.

NGC 180 is a barred spiral galaxy located in the constellation Pisces. It was discovered on December 29, 1790 by William Herschel.

A peculiar type II supernova was discovered in the galaxy in 2001 and given the designation SN 2001dj.

== See also ==
- List of NGC objects (1–1000)
