= NGC 450 =

Spiral galaxy in the constellation Cetus

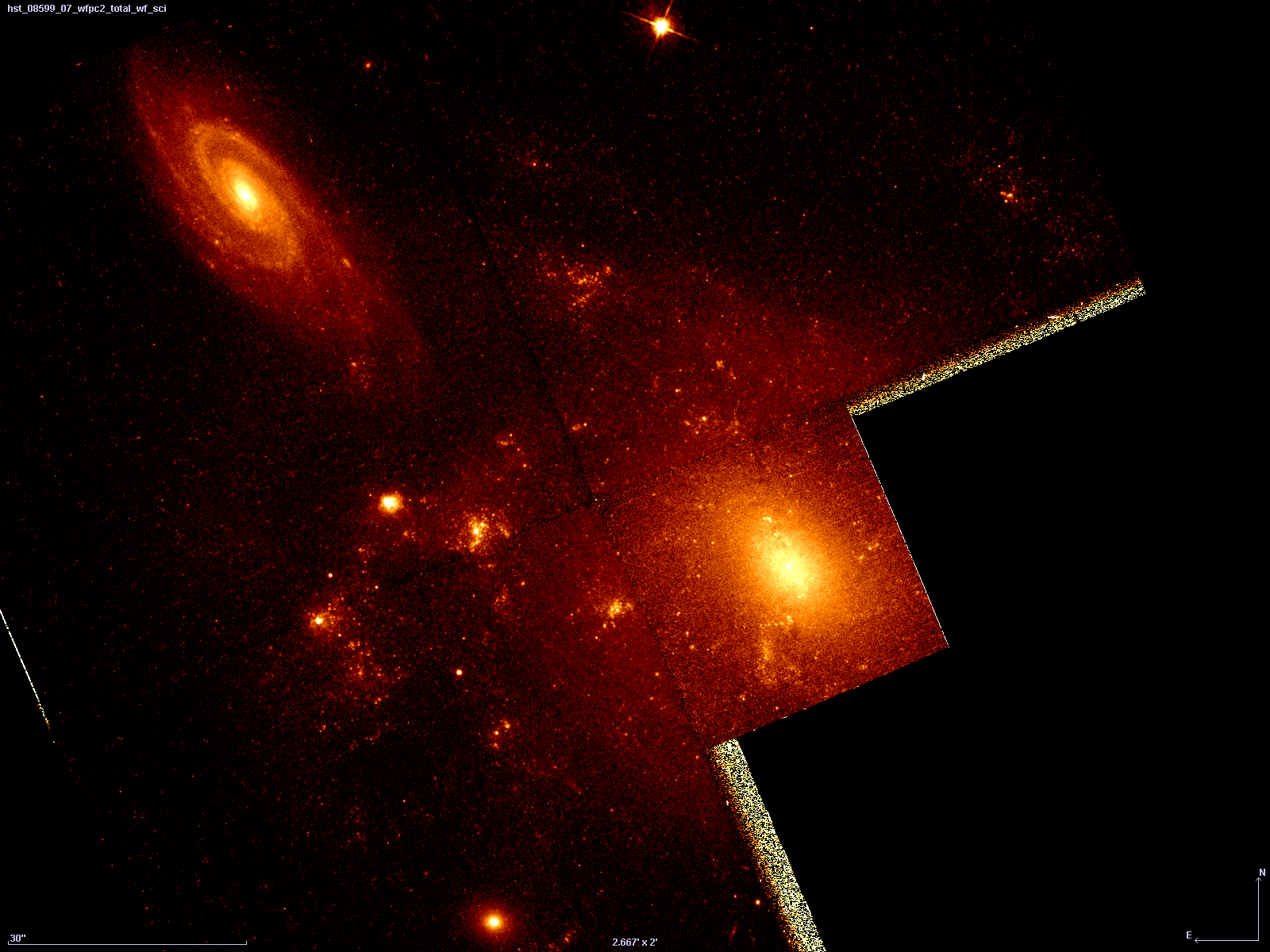
- NGC 450 (center right) seen from the Hubble Space Telescope, along with its companion, UGC 807. (top left corner)

Observation data (J2000 epoch)
- Constellation: Cetus
- Right ascension: 01^{h} 15^{m} 30.4^{s}
- Declination: −00° 51′ 40″
- Redshift: 0.005874
- Galactocentric velocity: 1761 km/s
- Apparent magnitude (V): 11.8

Characteristics
- Type: SBc

Other designations
- CGCG 385–52, IRAS 01129-0107, KCPG 27A, MCG 0-4-62, PGC 4540, UGC 806, UM 311

NGC 450 is a spiral galaxy located in the constellation Cetus. It was discovered in 1785 by William Herschel. NGC 450 has a very close companion, UGC 807 (or PGC 4545), which is attached at the northeast side of the halo. UGC 807 appears fairly faint, fairly small, and elongated. Despite that UGC 807 appears to form a double system, the companion has a redshift that is over six times greater than NGC 450, so they are a line-of-sight pair.

NGC 450
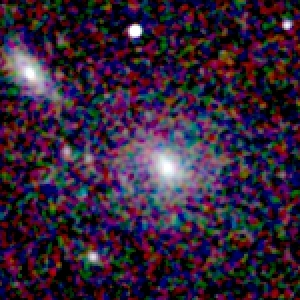
Photo taken by 2MASS

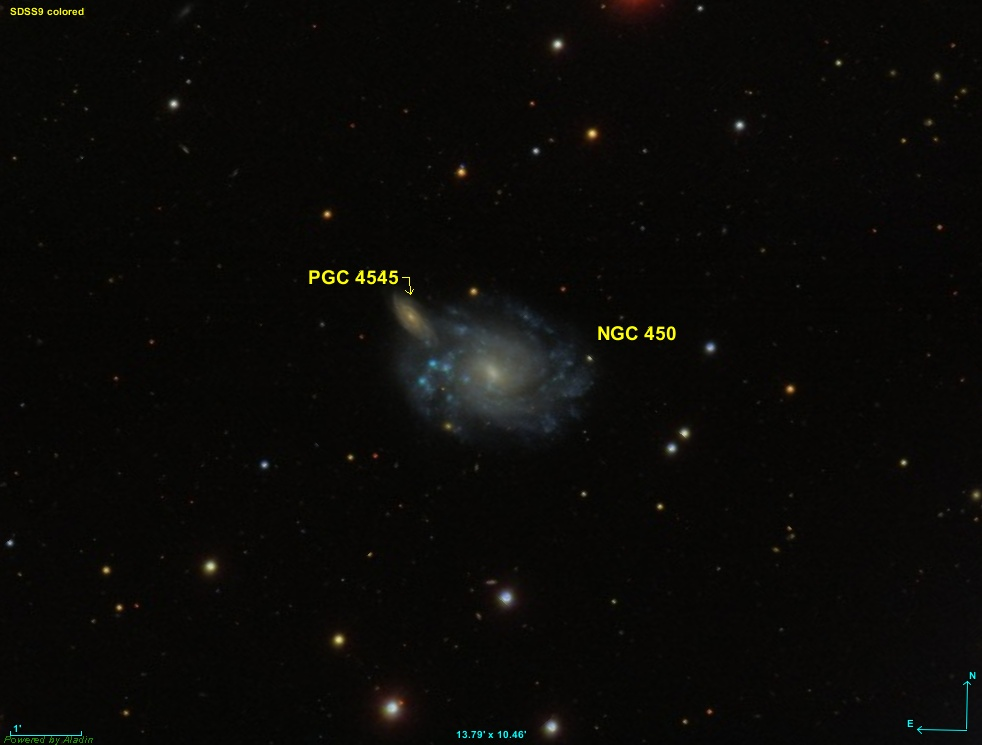
Photo of NGC 450 and PGC 4545 taken by SDSS.
