= NGC 100 =

Galaxy located in the constellation Pisces

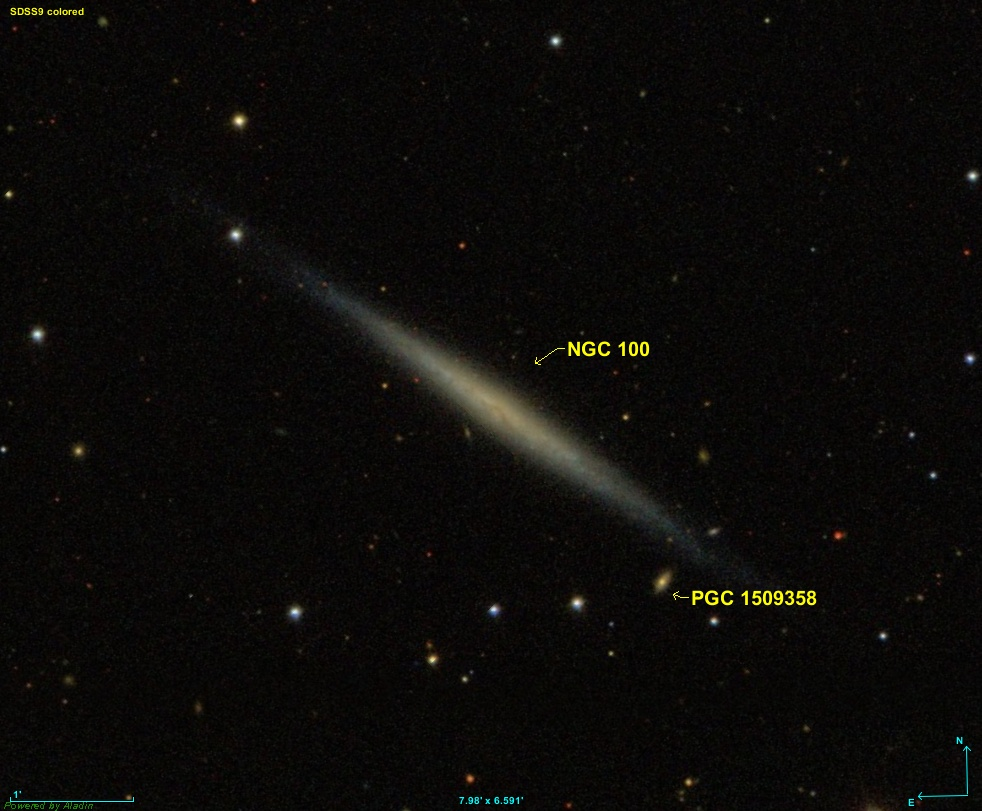
- SDSS image of NGC 100

Observation data (J2000 epoch)
- Constellation: Pisces
- Right ascension: 00^{h} 24^{m} 02.837^{s}
- Declination: +16° 29′ 11.00″
- Redshift: 0.002805
- Heliocentric radial velocity: 841
- Distance: 60.18 ± 0.65 Mly (18.45 ± 0.20 Mpc)
- Apparent magnitude (V): 13.26
- Apparent magnitude (B): 14.6

Characteristics
- Type: Scd:
- Size: 113,400 ly (34,770 pc)
- Apparent size (V): 6.16′ × 0.64′

Other designations
- UGC 231, MCG +03-02-009, PGC 1525

NGC 100 is a galaxy located approximately 60 million light-years from the Solar System in the constellation Pisces. It has an apparent magnitude of 13.2. It was first discovered on 10 November 1885 by American astronomer Lewis Swift.

== See also ==
- List of NGC objects (1–1000)
- Pisces (constellation)
