= NGC 467 =

Galaxy in the constellation Pisces

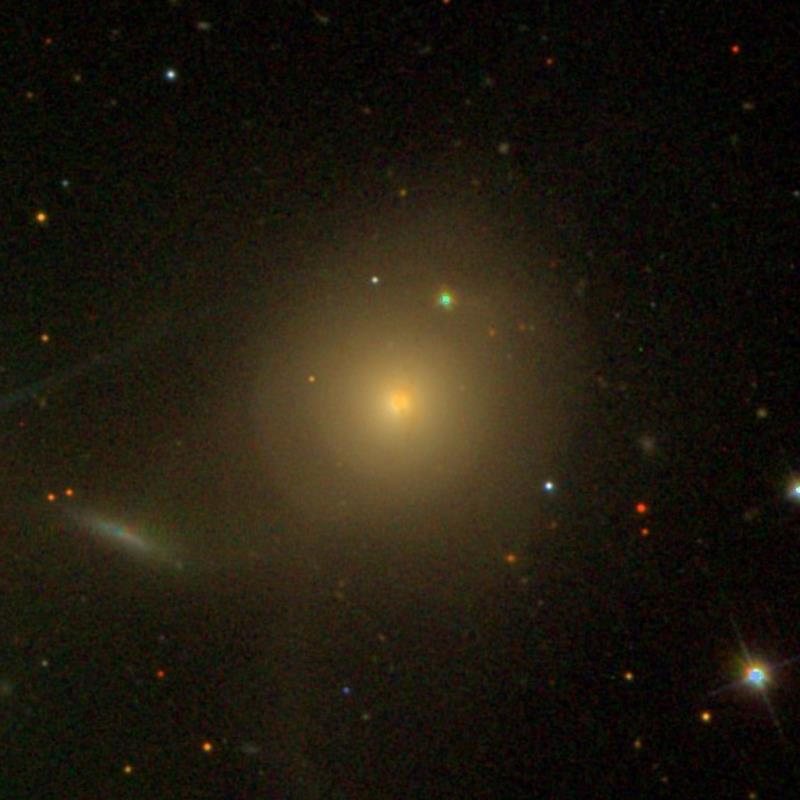
- SDSS image of NGC 467

Observation data (J2000 epoch)
- Constellation: Pisces
- Right ascension: 01^{h} 19^{m} 10.119^{s}
- Declination: +03° 18′ 03.20″
- Redshift: 0.018323
- Heliocentric radial velocity: 5443 km/s
- Distance: 238.3 Mly (73.06 Mpc)
- Apparent magnitude (V): 11.85
- Absolute magnitude (V): −21.99

Characteristics
- Type: SA0^{0}(s) pec?

Other designations
- UGC 848, MCG +00-04-079, PGC 4736

NGC 467 is an unbarred lenticular galaxy in the constellation Pisces. It was discovered on 8 October 1785 by William Herschel.

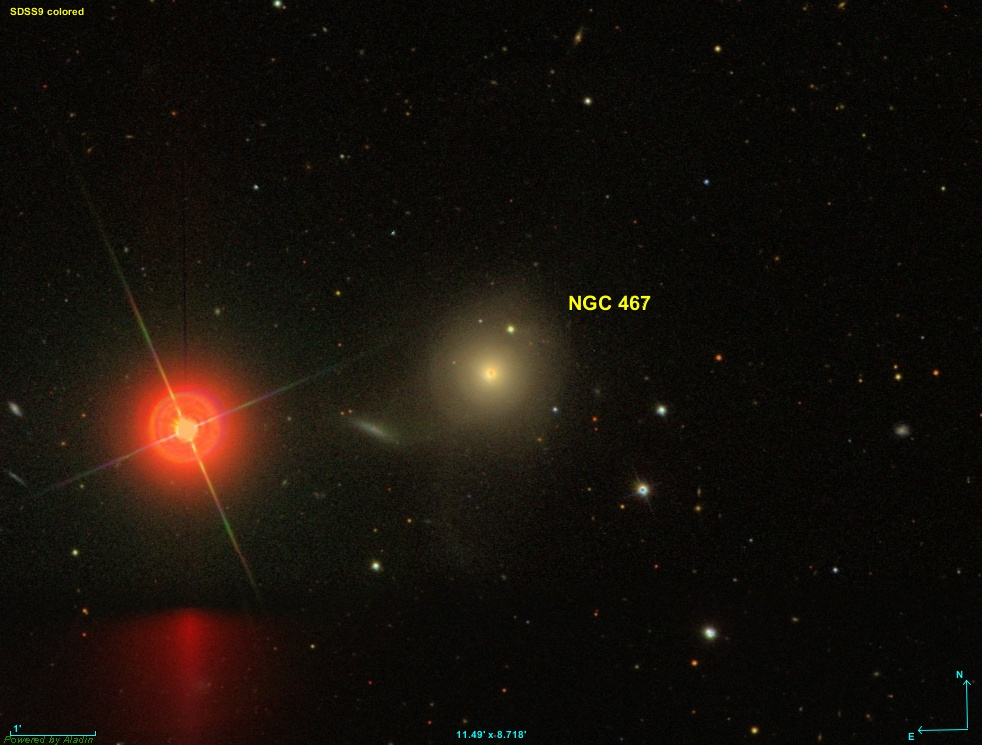
NGC 467 (SDSS)

== See also ==
- List of NGC objects (1–1000)
