= NGC 76 =

Galaxy in the constellation Andromeda

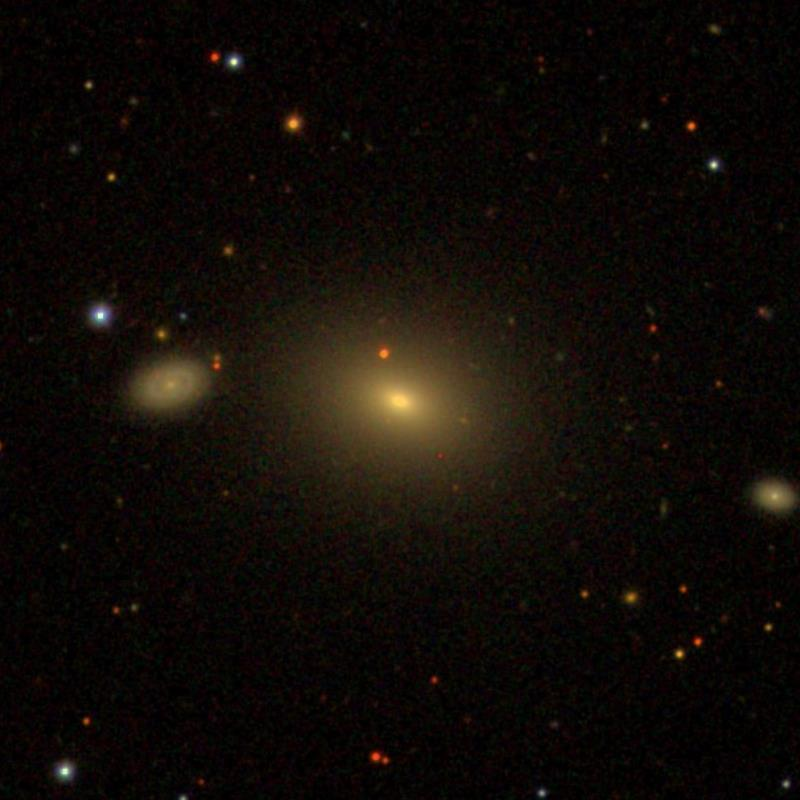
- SDSS image of NGC 76

Observation data (J2000 epoch)
- Constellation: Andromeda
- Right ascension: 00^{h} 19^{m} 37.79033^{s}
- Declination: +29° 56′ 01.9218″
- Redshift: 0.024734
- Heliocentric radial velocity: 7323 km/s
- Distance: 322.9 Mly (99.01 Mpc)
- Apparent magnitude (B): 14.0

Characteristics
- Type: S0

Other designations
- UGC 185, MCG +05-01-072, PGC 1267

NGC 76 is a lenticular galaxy estimated to be about 320 million light-years away in the constellation of Andromeda. It was discovered by Guillaume Bigourdan from France in 1884 and its magnitude is 13.1.
