= NGC 95 =

Spiral Galaxy in the constellation Pisces

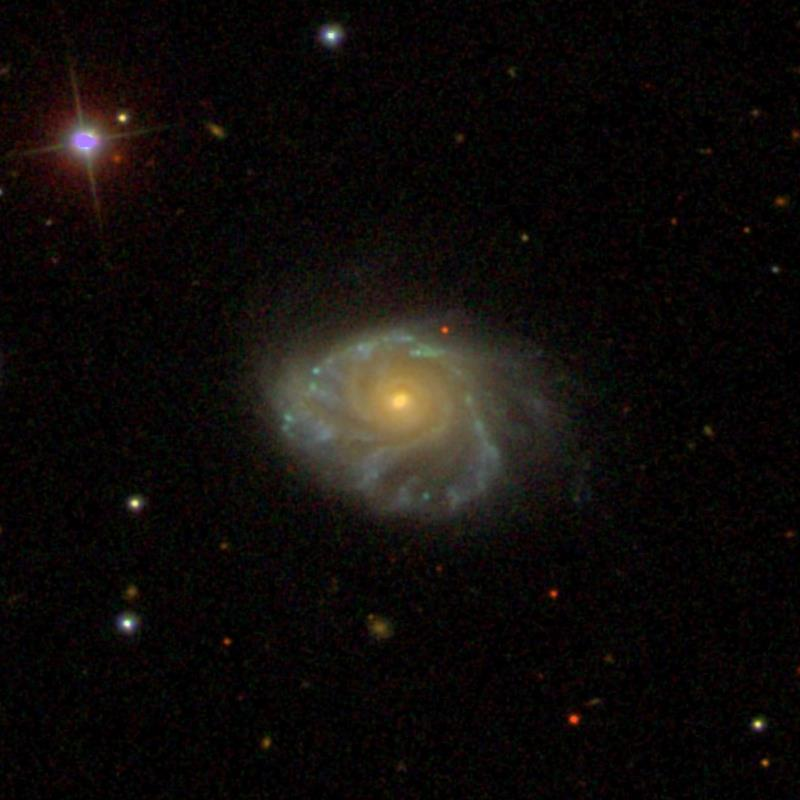
- SDSS image of NGC 95

Observation data (J2000 epoch)
- Constellation: Pisces
- Right ascension: 00^{h} 22^{m} 13.6^{s}
- Declination: +10° 29′ 30″
- Redshift: 0.017946
- Heliocentric radial velocity: 5380 km/s
- Distance: 250 Mly
- Apparent magnitude (V): 12.5 mag

Characteristics
- Type: SAB(rs)c?pec

Other designations
- UGC 214, PGC 1426, GC 47.

NGC 95 is a spiral galaxy located in the constellation Pisces. It was discovered by English astronomer John Fredrick William Herschel on October 18, 1784. The galaxy has several blue spiral arms surrounding a bright yellow nucleus, and is approximately 120,000 light years in diameter, making it only slightly larger than the Milky Way.
