= NGC 112 =

Galaxy in the constellation Andromeda

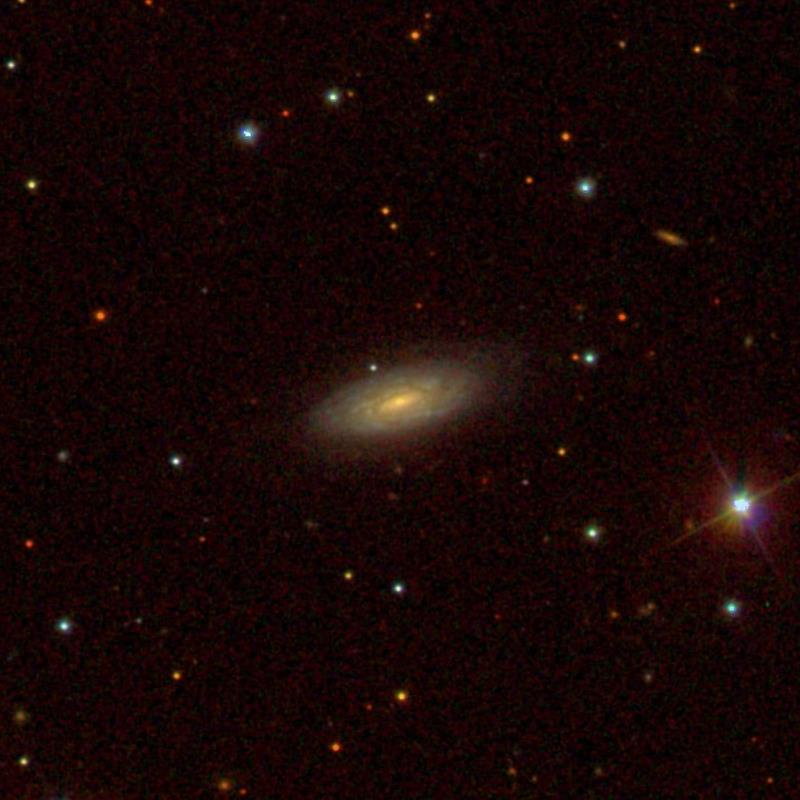
- SDSS image of NGC 112

Observation data (J2000 epoch)
- Constellation: Andromeda
- Right ascension: 00^{h} 26^{m} 48.74910^{s}
- Declination: +31° 42′ 11.9738″
- Redshift: 0.021028
- Heliocentric radial velocity: 6238 km/s
- Distance: 282.78 ± 0.65 Mly (86.70 ± 0.2 Mpc)
- Apparent magnitude (B): 14.5

Characteristics
- Type: SB(rs)bc?

Other designations
- UGC 255, MCG +05-02-013, PGC 1654

NGC 112 is a barred spiral galaxy located in the constellation Andromeda. It was discovered by American astronomer Lewis Swift on September 17, 1885. The galaxy lies approximately 295 million light-years from Earth, and is about 75,000 light-years in diameter.
