= NGC 137 =

Galaxy in the constellation Perseus

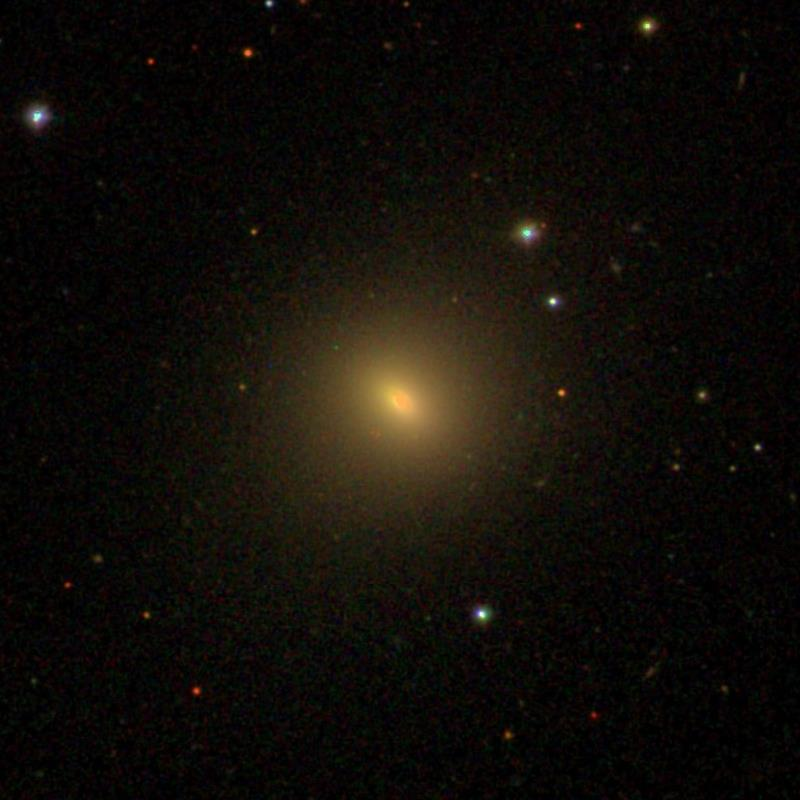
- SDSS image of NGC 137

Observation data (J2000 epoch)
- Constellation: Pisces
- Right ascension: 00^{h} 30^{m} 58.1^{s}
- Declination: +10° 12′ 30″
- Redshift: 0.017599
- Heliocentric radial velocity: 5276 km/s
- Distance: 236 million ly
- Apparent magnitude (V): 13.74

Characteristics
- Type: S0
- Notable features: "Faint, irregular figure, a little brighter middle."

Other designations
- UGC 309, PGC 1888

NGC 137 is a lenticular galaxy in the constellation of Pisces. It was discovered by William Herschel on November 23, 1785.
