= NGC 132 =

Spiral galaxy in the constellation Cetus

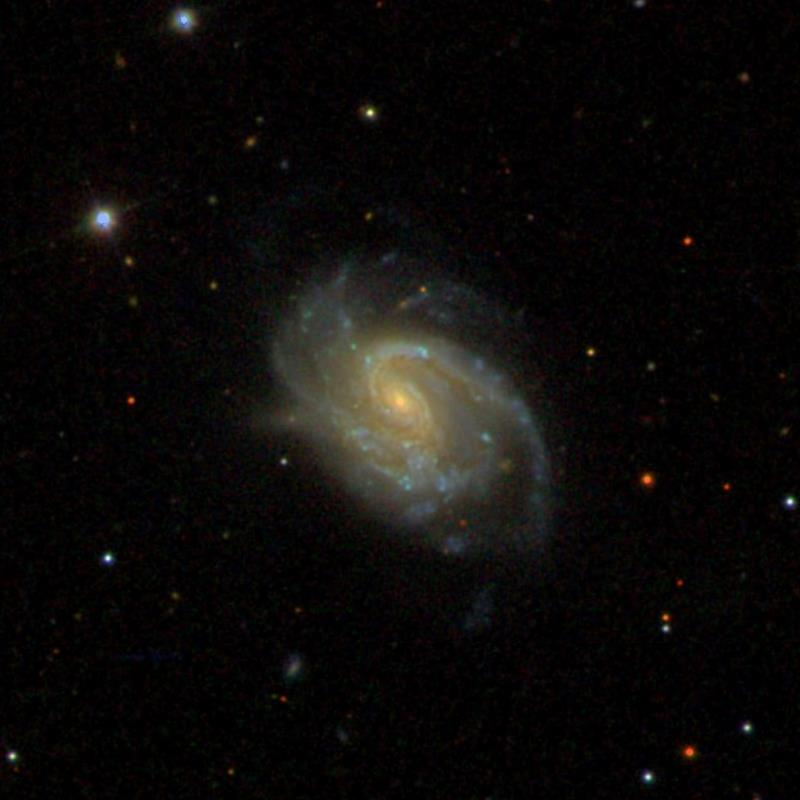
- NGC 132 imaged by SDSS

Observation data (J2000 epoch)
- Constellation: Cetus
- Right ascension: 00^{h} 30^{m} 10.7123^{s}
- Declination: +02° 05′ 36.497″
- Redshift: 0.017892
- Heliocentric radial velocity: 5364 ± 4 km/s
- Distance: 241.3 ± 16.9 Mly (73.97 ± 5.19 Mpc)
- Apparent magnitude (V): 13.45

Characteristics
- Type: SAB(s)bc
- Size: ~139,000 ly (42.61 kpc) (estimated)
- Apparent size (V): 1.95′ × 1.3′

Other designations
- IRAS 00276+0149, UGC 301, MCG +00-02-063, PGC 1844, CGCG 383-032

NGC 132 is a spiral galaxy in the constellation Cetus. Its velocity with respect to the cosmic microwave background is 5015 ± 25 km/s, which corresponds to a Hubble distance of 241.3 ± 16.9 Mly (73.97 ± 5.19 Mpc). In addition, three non redshift measurements give a distance of 250.81 ± 2.14 Mly (76.900 ± 0.656 Mpc). It was discovered on 25 December 1790 by German-British astronomer William Herschel.

Two supernovae have been observed in NGC 132: SN 2004fe (type Ic, mag. 18.1) was discovered on 30 October 2004, and SN 2024vku (type IIn, mag. 20.14) was discovered on 12 September 2024.

== Appearance ==
William Herschel described the spiral galaxy as, "pretty faint, considerably large, round, very gradually little brighter middle, mottled but not resolved." On October 12, 1827, John Herschel observed it again.

== See also ==
- List of NGC objects (1–1000)
