= NGC 431 =

Lenticular galaxy in constellation Andromeda

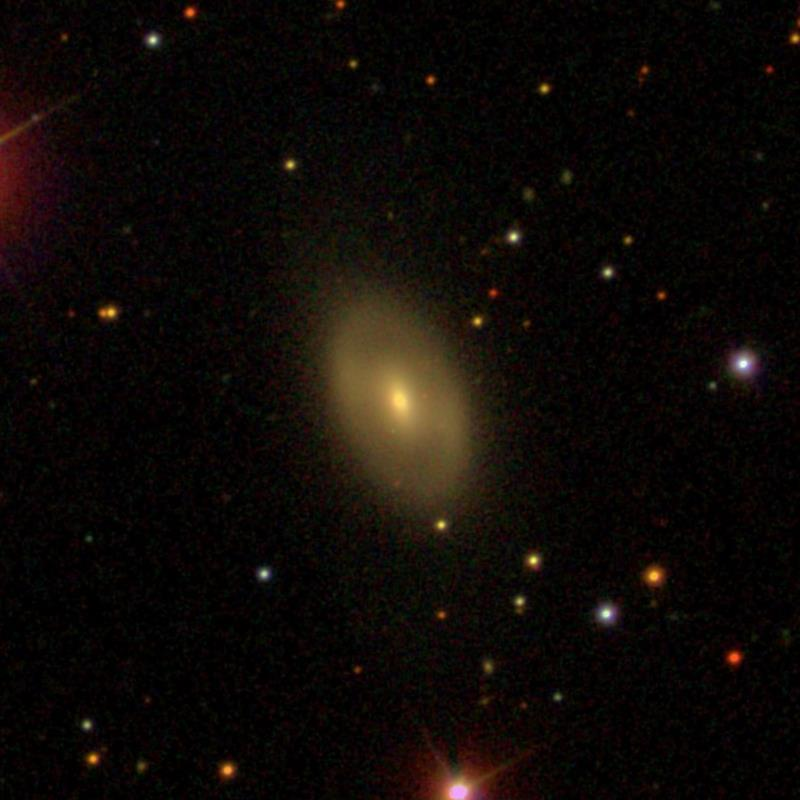
- NGC 431 by Sloan Digital Sky Survey

Observation data (J2000 epoch)
- Constellation: Andromeda
- Right ascension: 01^{h} 14^{m} 04.5^{s}
- Declination: +33° 42′ 15″
- Redshift: 0.019107
- Heliocentric radial velocity: 5,728 km/s
- Distance: 318.55 ± 74.14 Mly (97.667 ± 22.732 Mpc)
- Apparent magnitude (V): 13.86
- Absolute magnitude (V): -22.96

Characteristics
- Type: SB0
- Apparent size (V): 1.4' × 0.9'

Other designations
- UGC 00776, CGCG 501-132, MCG +05-04-002, 2MASX J01140455+3342149, PGC 4437.

NGC 431 is a lenticular galaxy of type SB0 located in the constellation Andromeda. It was discovered on November 22, 1827 by John Herschel. It was described by Dreyer as "faint, small, very suddenly brighter middle."

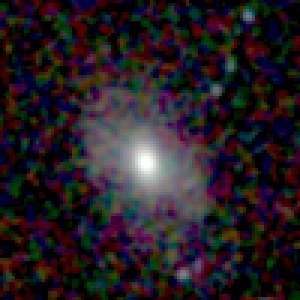
NGC 431 (2MASS)
