= NGC 183 =

Galaxy in the constellation Andromeda

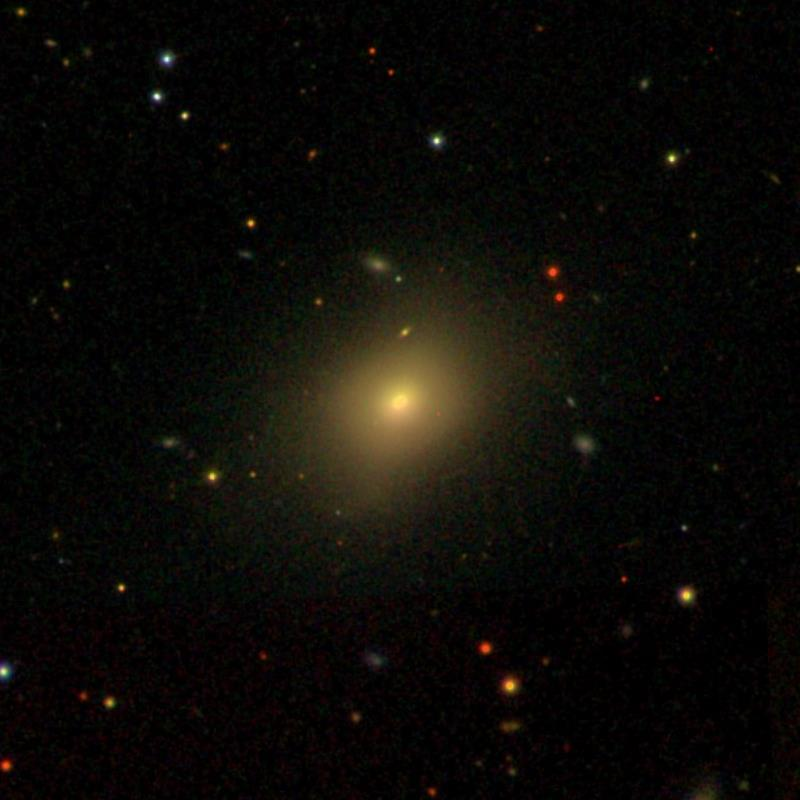
- SDSS view of NGC 183

Observation data (J2000 epoch)
- Constellation: Andromeda
- Right ascension: 00^{h} 38^{m} 29.4^{s}
- Declination: +29° 30′ 40″
- Redshift: 0.018019
- Apparent magnitude (V): 13.74

Characteristics
- Type: E
- Apparent size (V): 2.1' × 1.6'

Other designations
- UGC 387, CGCG 500-057, MCG +05-02-035, 2MASX J00382939+2930404, 2MASXi J0038294+293040, PGC 2298.

NGC 183 is an elliptical galaxy located in the constellation Andromeda. It was discovered on November 5, 1866, by Truman Safford.

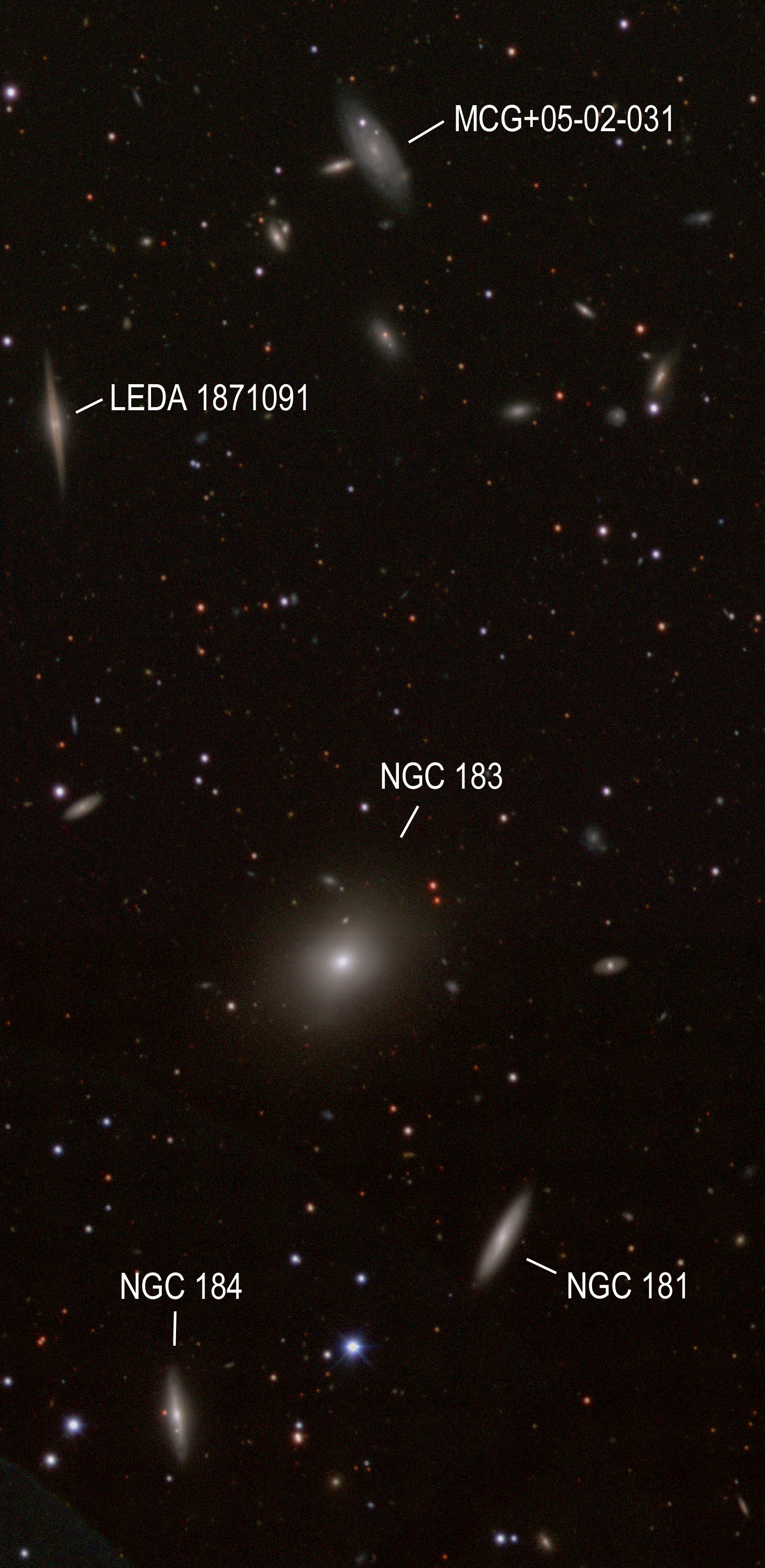
NGC 183 and some surrounding galaxies (DECam)
