= NGC 204 =

Galaxy in the constellation Pisces

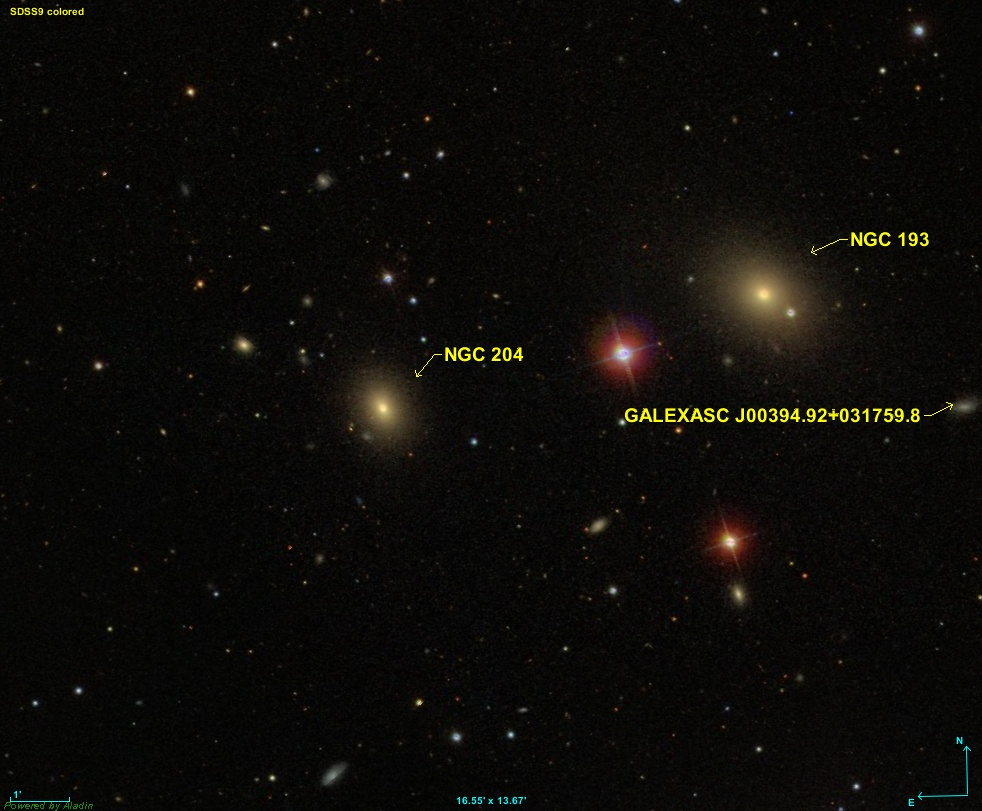

Observation data (J2000 epoch)
- Constellation: Pisces
- Right ascension: 00^{h} 39^{m} 44.3^{s}
- Declination: +03° 17′ 58″
- Redshift: 0.017986
- Distance: 241 Mly
- Apparent magnitude (V): 13.8

Characteristics
- Type: SA0^{0}(s) pec:
- Apparent size (V): 1.2' × 1.1'

Other designations
- UGC 423, CGCG 383-063, MCG +00-02-116, 2MASX J00394426+0317585, PGC 2397.

NGC 204 is an unbarred lenticular galaxy located approximately 241 million light-years from the Solar System in the constellation Pisces. It was discovered on December 21, 1786, by William Herschel.

== See also ==
- List of NGC objects (1–1000)
