= NGC 227 =

Galaxy in the constellation Cetus

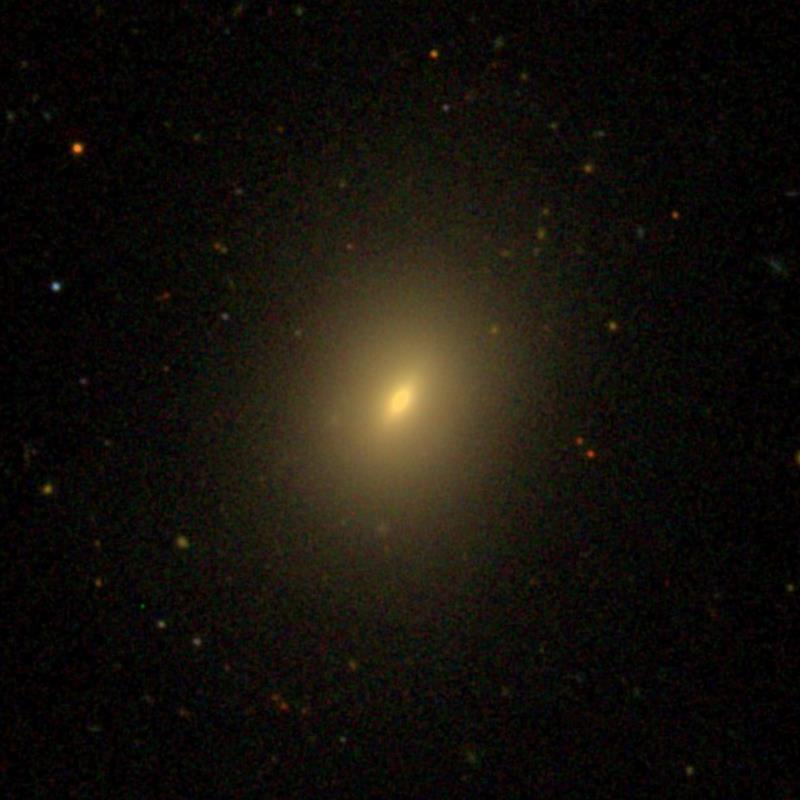
- SDSS image of NGC 227

Observation data (J2000 epoch)
- Constellation: Cetus
- Right ascension: 00^{h} 42^{m} 36.8^{s}
- Declination: −01° 31′ 44″
- Redshift: 0.017669
- Distance: 237 Mly
- Apparent magnitude (V): 13.11

Characteristics
- Type: S0
- Apparent size (V): 1.6' × 1.3'

Other designations
- UGC 456, CGCG 383-076, MCG +00-02-135, 2MASX J00423684-0131436, 2MASXi J0042365-013137, 6dF J0042367-013144, PGC 2547.

NGC 227 is a lenticular galaxy located approximately 237 million light-years from the Sun in the constellation Cetus. It was discovered on October 1, 1785 by William Herschel.

== See also ==
- List of NGC objects (1–1000)
