= NGC 425 =

Galaxy in constellation Andromeda

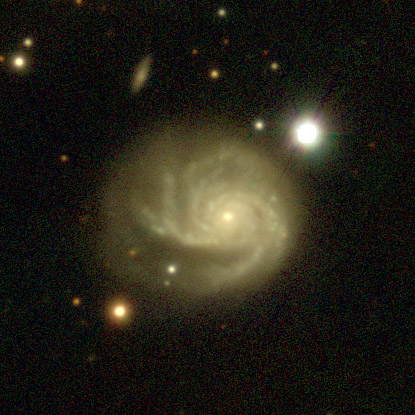
- PanSTARRS image of NGC 425

Observation data (J2000 epoch)
- Constellation: Andromeda
- Right ascension: 01^{h} 13^{m} 02.5^{s}
- Declination: 38° 46′ 06″
- Redshift: 0.021475
- Heliocentric radial velocity: 6,438 km/s
- Distance: 58.100 Mpc
- Apparent magnitude (V): 12.7

Characteristics
- Type: Sc
- Apparent size (V): 0.95′ × 0.8′

Other designations
- UGC 758, MCG +06-03-023, PGC 4379

NGC 425 is a spiral galaxy in the constellation of Andromeda. It was discovered on 29 October 1866 by Truman Safford.
