= NGC 186 =

Galaxy in the constellation Pisces

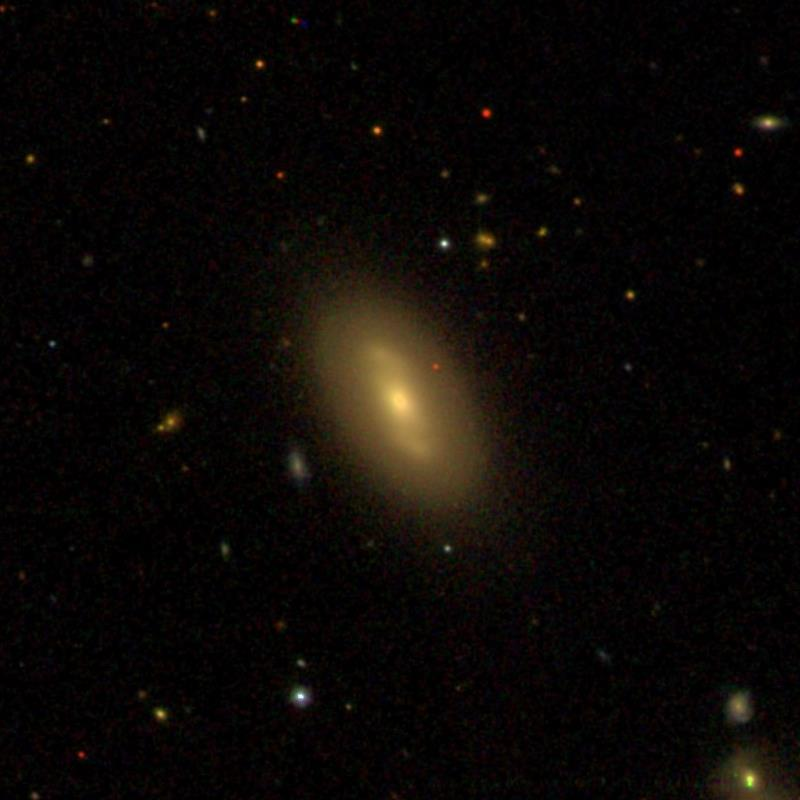
- SDSS image of NGC 186

Observation data (J2000 epoch)
- Constellation: Pisces
- Right ascension: 00^{h} 38^{m} 25.3^{s}
- Declination: +03° 09′ 59″
- Redshift: 0.015551
- Apparent magnitude (V): 14.40

Characteristics
- Type: SB0^{+} pec:
- Apparent size (V): 1.4' × 0.8'

Other designations
- UGC 00390, CGCG 383-047, MCG +00-02-098, 2MASX J00382530+0309592, PGC 2291.

NGC 186 is a barred lenticular galaxy located 3.4 million light-years away in the constellation Pisces. It was discovered by Bindon Blood Stoney in 1852.
