= NGC 463 =

Galaxy in the constellation Pisces

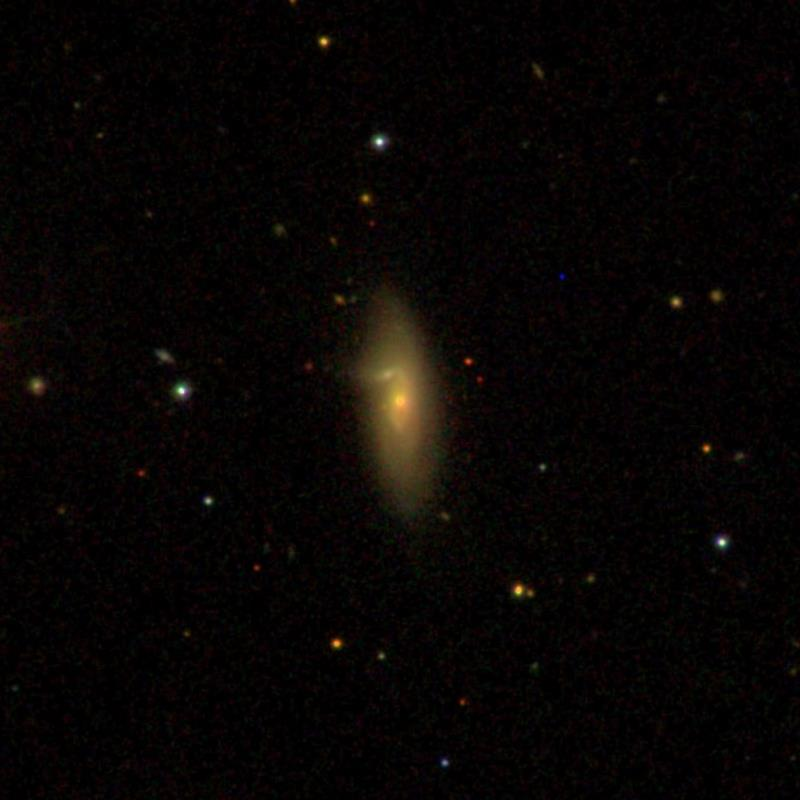
- SDSS image of NGC 463

Observation data (J2000 epoch)
- Constellation: Pisces
- Right ascension: 01^{h} 18^{m} 58.2^{s}.
- Declination: 16° 19′ 33″
- Redshift: 0.021005/6297 km/s
- Distance: 264 million ly
- Apparent magnitude (V): 15.2

Characteristics
- Type: S0
- Apparent size (V): 1.2' × 0.4'

Other designations
- CGCG 459-25, MCG 3-4-19, PGC 4719, UGC 840

NGC 463 is a lenticular galaxy located about 264 million light-years away from Earth in the constellation Pisces. It was discovered by French astronomer Édouard Stephan on December 16, 1871.

== See also ==
- Lenticular galaxy
- List of NGC objects (1–1000)
