= NGC 78 =

Pair of galaxies in the constellation Pisces

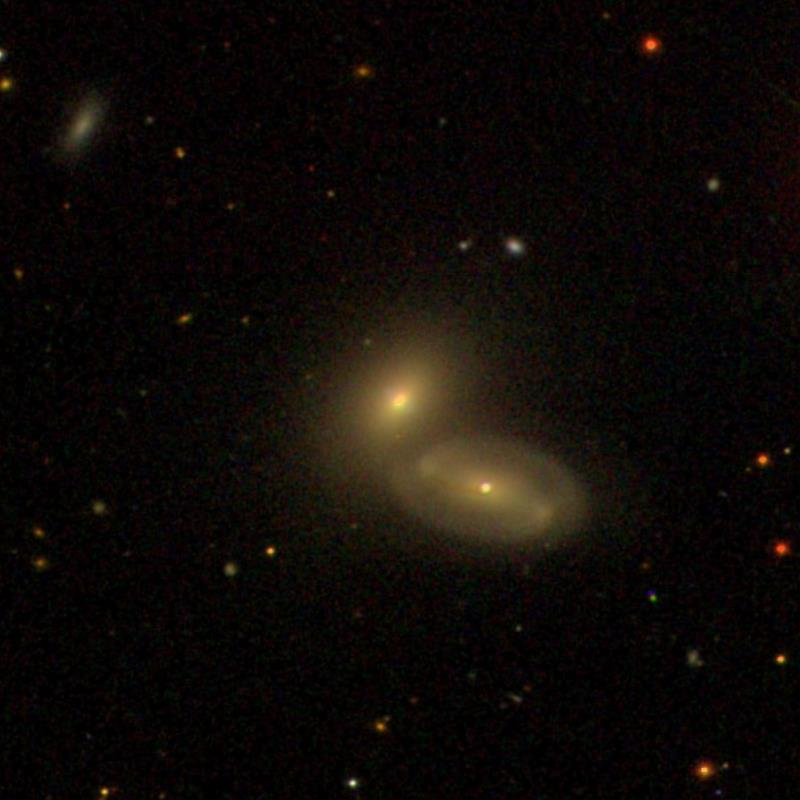
- SDSS image of NGC 78A (bottom right) and 78B (top left)

Observation data (J2000 epoch)
- Constellation: Pisces
- Right ascension: 00^{h} 20^{m} 27.482^{s}
- Declination: +00° 50′ 00.96″
- Redshift: 0.018283
- Heliocentric radial velocity: 5079 km/s
- Apparent magnitude (B): 14.5

Characteristics
- Type: SB0/a?(r)
- Size: 84,100 ly (25,790 pc) (Note: POSS1 103a-O values used.)
- Apparent size (V): 1.3′ × 0.897′

Other designations
- NGC 78A: UGC 193, MGC+00-02-004, PGC 1306; NGC 78B: UGC 194, MGC+00-02-005, PGC 1309

NGC 78 is a pair of galaxies in the constellation Pisces. NGC 78A, which is the more southern galaxy, is a barred spiral galaxy. NGC 78B, which is the more northern galaxy, is an elliptical galaxy. Although the designations NGC 78A and 78B are used today, the designation NGC 78 was formerly used mainly for the northern galaxy.

== Discovery ==
NGC 78 was discovered no later than 1876 by Carl Frederick Pechüle. It was described as "very faint, small, round" by John Louis Emil Dreyer, the compiler of the New General Catalogue. Because the two galaxies have different recessional velocities, the two galaxies are most likely not interacting.
