= NGC 532 =

Galaxy in the constellation Pisces

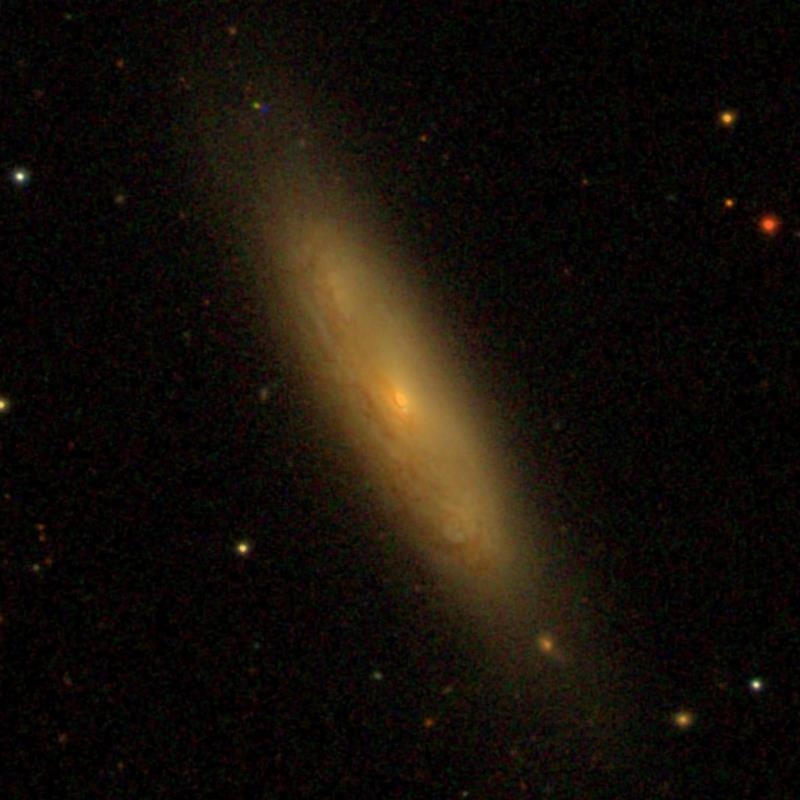
- SDSS image of NGC 532

Observation data (J2000 epoch)
- Constellation: Pisces
- Right ascension: 01^{h} 25^{m} 17.348^{s}
- Declination: +09° 15′ 50.71″
- Redshift: 0.00762
- Heliocentric radial velocity: 2276 km/s
- Distance: 105.1 Mly (32.21 Mpc)
- Apparent magnitude (V): 12.20
- Apparent magnitude (B): 13.94

Characteristics
- Type: Sab?

Other designations
- UGC 982, MCG +01-04-056, PGC 5264

NGC 532 is a spiral galaxy in the constellation Pisces. The galaxy is approximately 100 million light-years (30 Megaparsecs) away from the Earth, and was discovered on September 21, 1786, by the German-British astronomer William Herschel.

== See also ==
- List of NGC objects
