= NGC 214 =

Galaxy in the constellation Andromeda

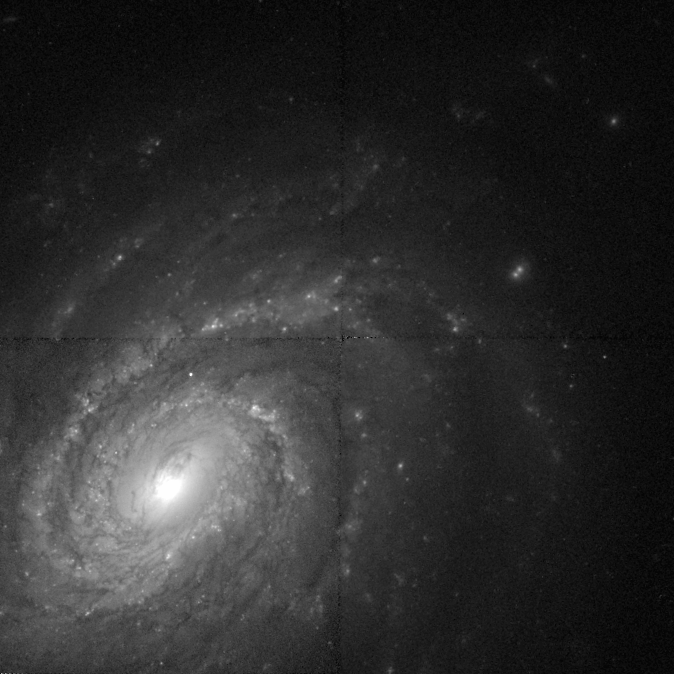
- HST image of NGC 214

Observation data (J2000 epoch)
- Constellation: Andromeda
- Right ascension: 00^{h} 41^{m} 28.02246^{s}
- Declination: +25° 29′ 57.8430″
- Redshift: 0.015134
- Heliocentric radial velocity: 4,555 km/s
- Distance: 193.8 Mly (59.43 Mpc)
- Apparent magnitude (V): 12.97

Characteristics
- Type: SABbc
- Apparent size (V): 1.9' × 1.4'

Other designations
- UGC 438, MCG +04-02-044, IRAS 00387+2513, F00388+2513, CGCG 479-059, 2MASX J00412801+2529576, 2MASXi J0041280+252957, PGC 2479.

NGC 214 is a spiral galaxy in the northern constellation of Andromeda, located at a distance of 194 megalight-years from the Milky Way. It was discovered on September 10, 1784, by William Herschel. The shape of this galaxy is given by its morphological classification of SABbc, which indicates a weak bar-like structure (SAB) at the core and moderate to loosely-wound spiral arms (bc).

On July 19, 2005, a magnitude 17.4 supernova was detected at a position 16″ west and 2″ north of the galactic nucleus. The object was not visible on plates taken July 2, so it likely erupted after that date. Designated SN 2005db, it was determined to be a type IIn supernova based on the spectrum. A second supernova event was spotted from an image taken August 30, 2006, at 43″ west and 11.3″ south of the nucleus. It reached magnitude 17.8 and was designated SN 2006ep. This was determined to be a type-Ib/c supernova.
