= NGC 257 =

Galaxy in the constellation Pisces

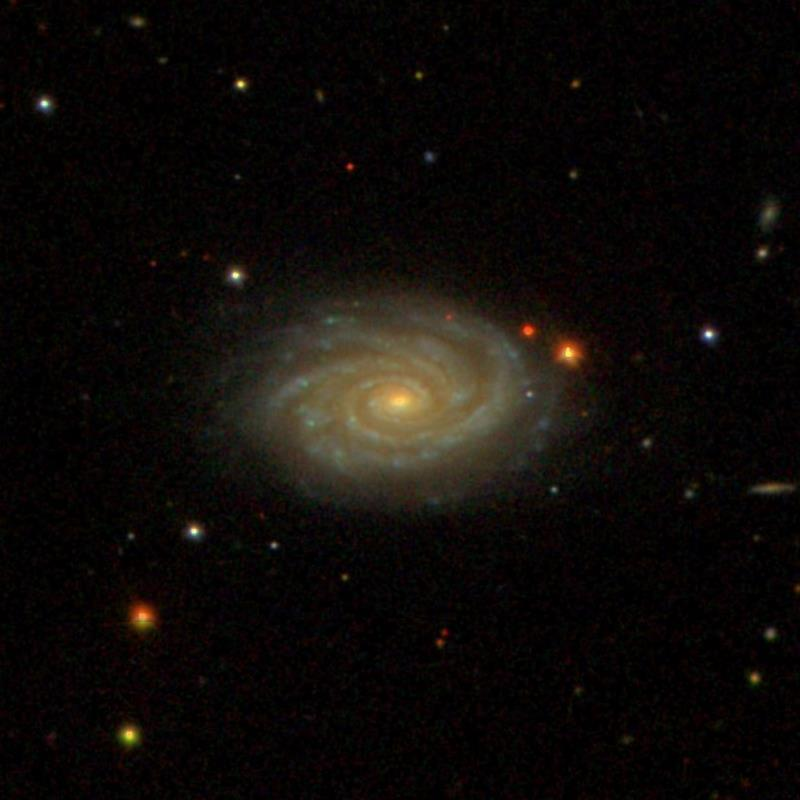
- SDSS image of NGC 257

Observation data (J2000 epoch)
- Constellation: Pisces
- Right ascension: 00^{h} 48^{m} 01.510^{s}
- Declination: +08° 17′ 49.45″
- Redshift: 0.017592
- Heliocentric radial velocity: 5274 km/s
- Distance: 219.64 ± 34.73 Mly (67.343 ± 10.649 Mpc)
- Apparent magnitude (B): 13.7

Characteristics
- Type: Scd?
- Size: 141,000 ly (43,100 pc) (Note: POSS1 103a-O values used.)
- Apparent size (V): 3.0′ × 2.5′

Other designations
- UGC 493, MGC+01-03-003, PGC 2818

NGC 257 is a spiral galaxy in the constellation Pisces. It was discovered on December 29, 1790, by Frederick William Herschel.
