= NGC 473 =

Lenticular galaxy in the constellation Pisces

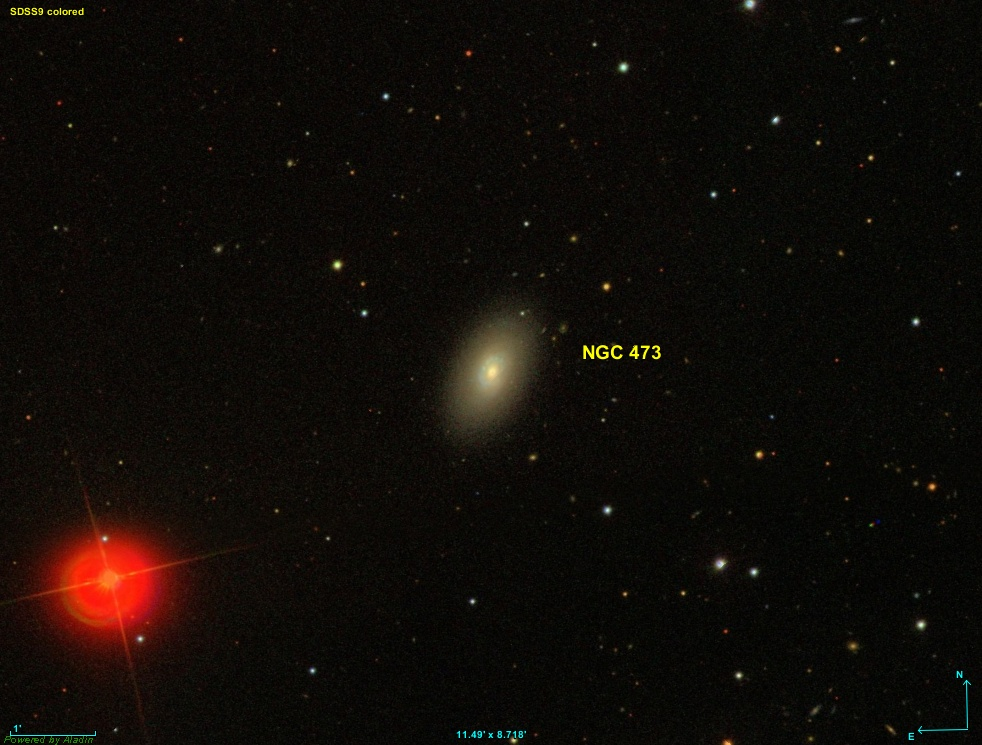
- SDSS view of NGC 473

Observation data (J2000 epoch)
- Constellation: Pisces
- Right ascension: 01^{h} 19^{m} 55.0731^{s}
- Declination: +16° 32′ 41.668″
- Redshift: 0.007118
- Heliocentric radial velocity: 2,134 km/s
- Distance: 29.8 Mpc
- Apparent magnitude (V): 12.5

Characteristics
- Type: SABo(r)a
- Size: ~73,500 ly (22.54 kpc) (estimated)
- Apparent size (V): 1.9' x 1.2'

Other designations
- IRAS 01172+1616, UGC 859, MCG +03-04-022, PGC 4785, CGCG 459-030

NGC 473 is a lenticular galaxy in the constellation of Pisces. Its velocity with respect to the cosmic microwave background is 1819 ± 22 km/s, which corresponds to a Hubble distance of 87.5 ± 6.2 Mly (26.82 ± 1.91 Mpc). In addition, one non redshift measurement gives a distance of 97 Mly (29.8 Mpc). It was discovered on December 20, 1786 by William Herschel.

== See also ==
- List of NGC objects (1–1000)
