= NGC 426 =

Galaxy in the constellation of Cetus

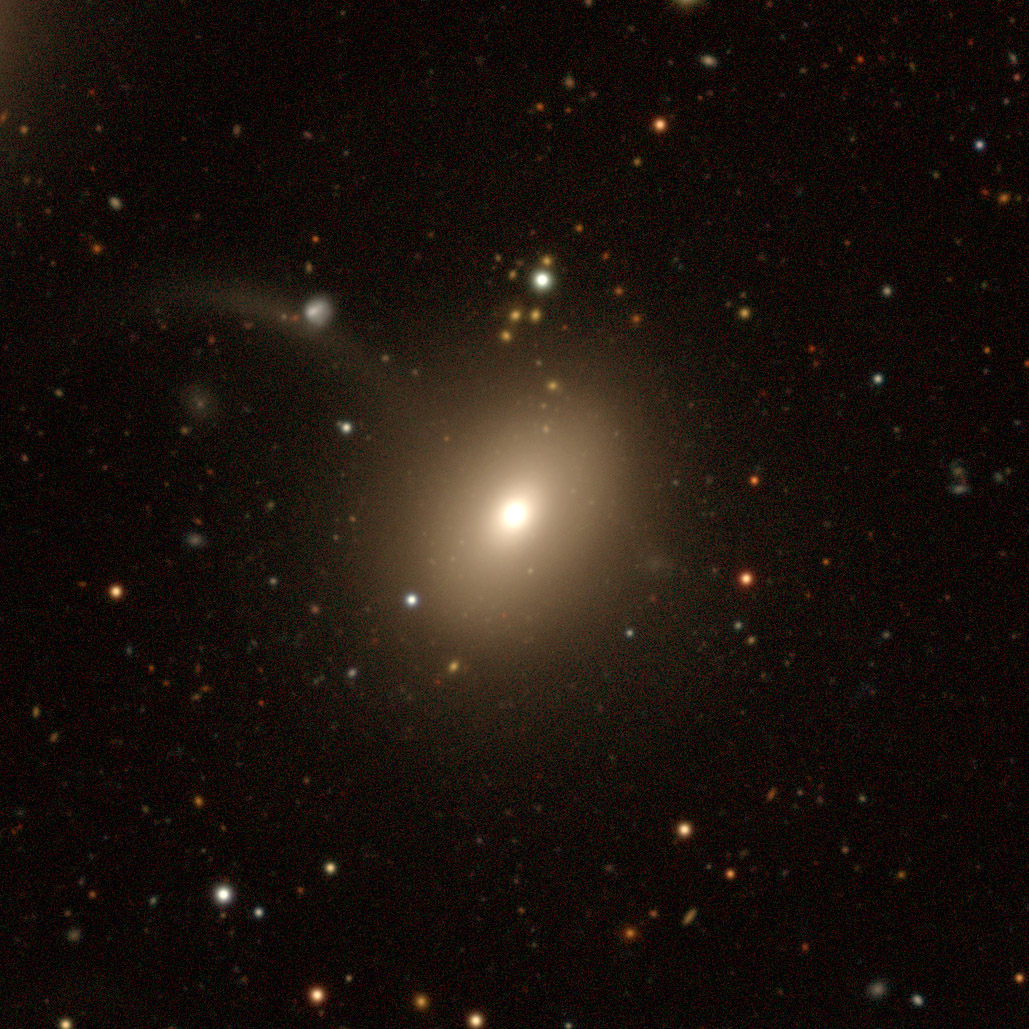
- NGC 426 (legacy surveys DR9)

Observation data (J2000 epoch)
- Constellation: Cetus
- Right ascension: 01^{h} 12^{m} 48.6^{s}
- Declination: 00° 17′ 25″
- Redshift: 0.017343
- Heliocentric radial velocity: 5,199 km/s
- Distance: 486 million ly
- Apparent magnitude (V): 12.9

Characteristics
- Type: E3 pec
- Apparent size (V): 1.25′ × 1.0′

Other designations
- UGC 760, MCG +00-04-035, PGC 4363

NGC 426 is an elliptical galaxy that is also classified as a Seyfert galaxy. It is located in the constellation of Cetus, and it was discovered on December 20, 1786, by William Herschel.
