= NGC 233 =

Galaxy in the constellation Andromeda

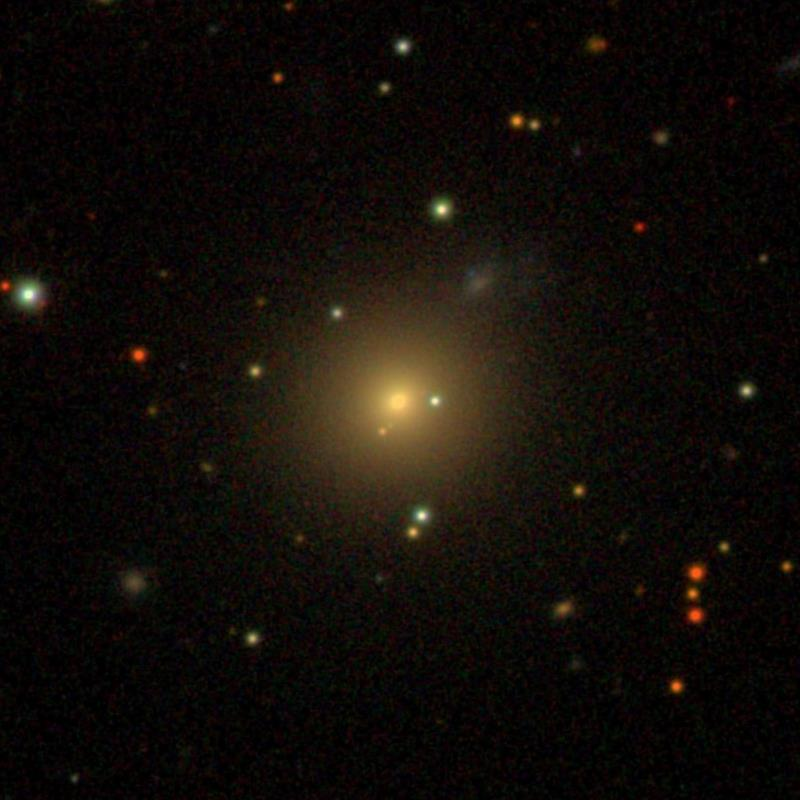
- SDSS image of NGC 233

Observation data (J2000 epoch)
- Constellation: Andromeda
- Right ascension: 00^{h} 43^{m} 36.5^{s}
- Declination: +30° 35′ 13″
- Redshift: 0.018086
- Apparent magnitude (V): 13.44

Characteristics
- Type: E:
- Apparent size (V): 1.7' × 1.5'

Other designations
- UGC 00464, CGCG 500-078, MCG +05-02-041, 2MASX J00433654+3035132, 2MASXi J0043365+303513, PGC 2604.

NGC 233 is an elliptical galaxy located in the constellation Andromeda. It was discovered on September 11, 1784, by William Herschel.

One supernova has been observed in NGC 233: SN 2021abzd (type Ia-91bg-like, mag. 17.3).

== See also ==
- List of NGC objects (1–1000)
