= NGC 479 =

Spiral galaxy in the constellation Pisces

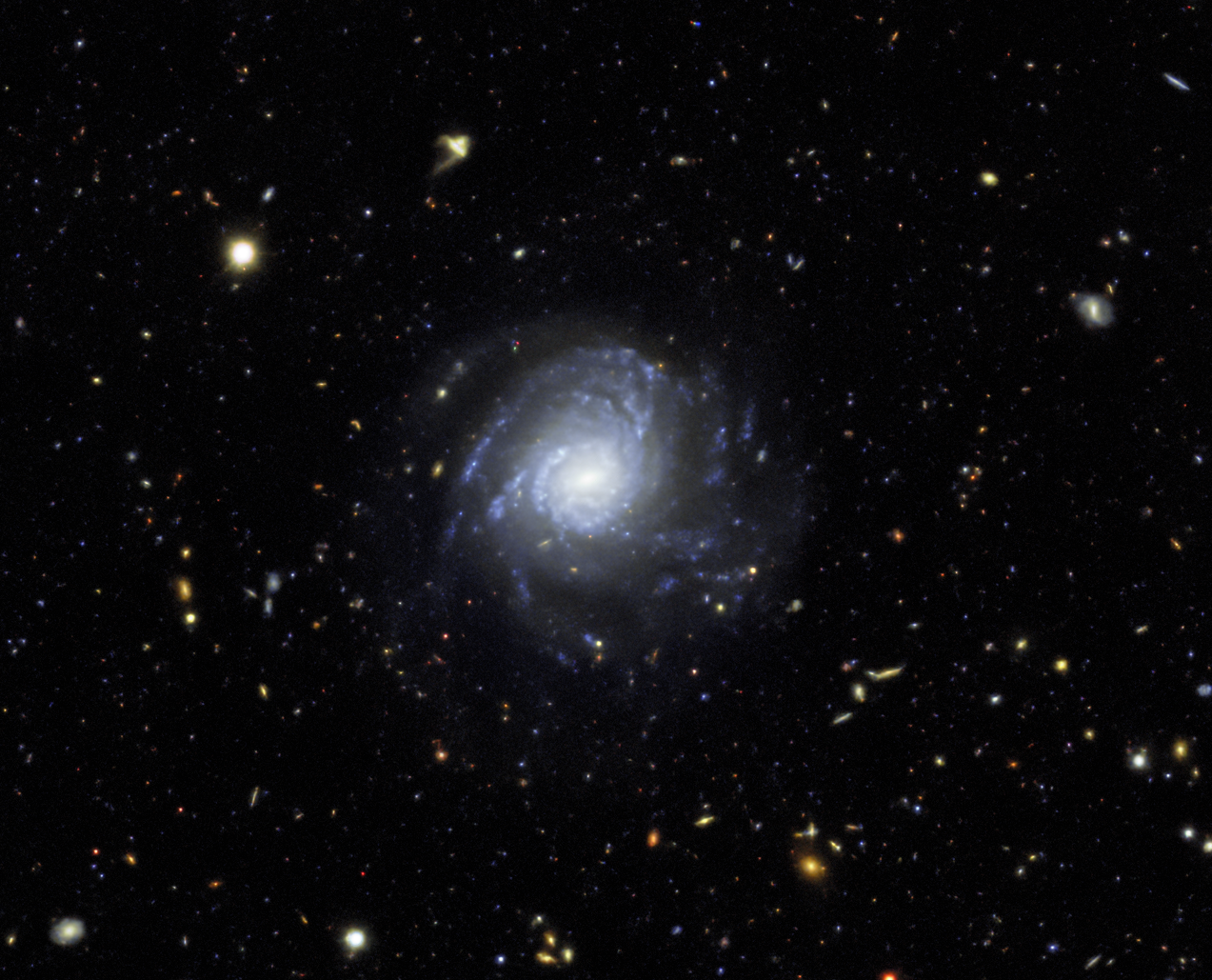
- NGC 479 imaged by the Dark Energy Survey

Observation data (J2000 epoch)
- Constellation: Pisces
- Right ascension: 01^{h} 21^{m} 15.723^{s}
- Declination: +03° 51′ 44.09″
- Redshift: 0.017569
- Heliocentric radial velocity: 5221 km/s
- Distance: 240 Mly (74 Mpc)
- Apparent magnitude (B): 14.52

Characteristics
- Type: SB(rs)bc:

Other designations
- UGC 893, MCG +01-04-031, PGC 4905

NGC 479 (also known as UGC 893, MCG 1-4-31, ZWG 411.31, PGC 4905) is a spiral galaxy in the constellation Pisces. It was discovered by German astronomer Albert Marth on October 27, 1864. It is about 240 million light-years away from Earth.
