= NGC 533 =

Elliptical galaxy in the constellation Cetus

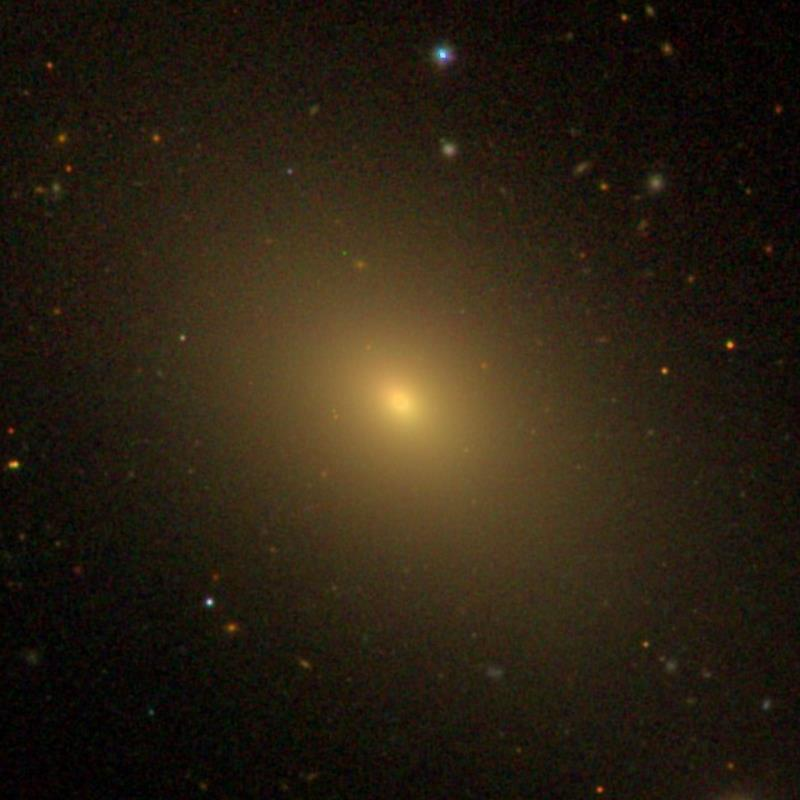
- SDSS image of NGC 533

Observation data (J2000 epoch)
- Constellation: Cetus
- Right ascension: 01^{h} 25^{m} 31.432^{s}
- Declination: +01° 45′ 33.57″
- Redshift: 0.018509
- Heliocentric radial velocity: 5549 km/s
- Distance: 200.86 ± 39.79 Mly (61.583 ± 12.199 Mpc)
- Apparent magnitude (V): 11.27
- Apparent magnitude (B): 13.1
- Absolute magnitude (V): −22.64

Characteristics
- Type: E3:
- Size: 233,700 ly (71,660 pc) (Note: POSS1 103a-O values used.)
- Apparent size (V): 3.8′ × 2.3′

Other designations
- UGC 992, MGC+00-04-131, PGC 5283

NGC 533 is an elliptical galaxy in the constellation Cetus. It was discovered on October 8, 1785, by William Herschel. It was described as "pretty bright, pretty large, round, gradually brighter middle" by John Louis Emil Dreyer, the compiler of the New General Catalogue.

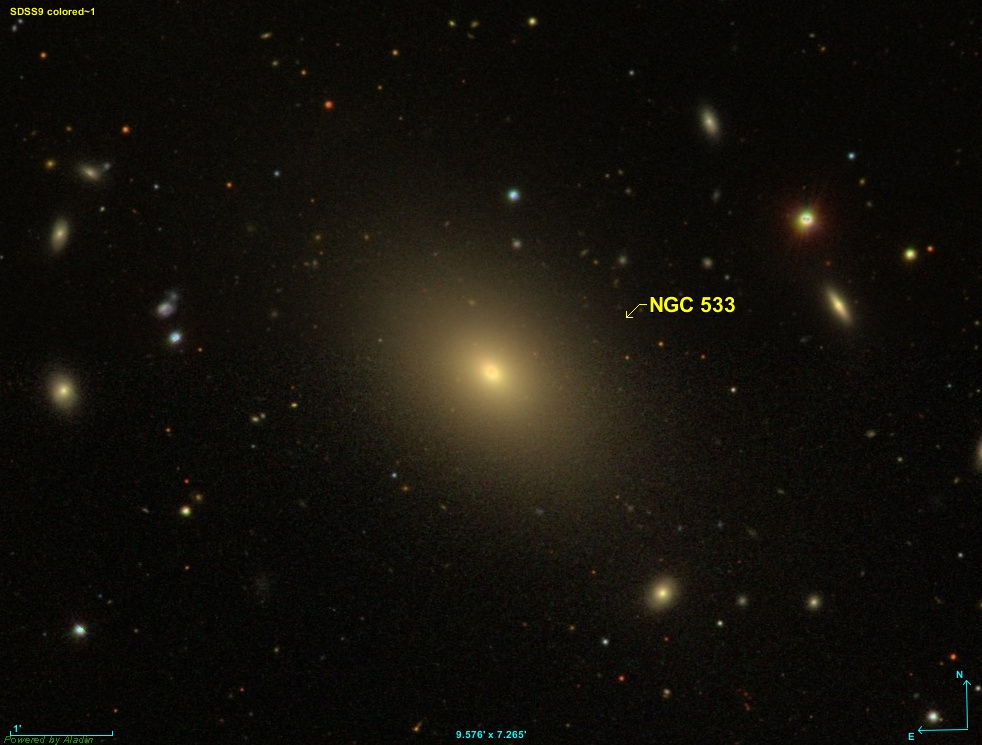
NGC 533 (SDSS)
