= NGC 149 =

Lenticular galaxy in Andromeda

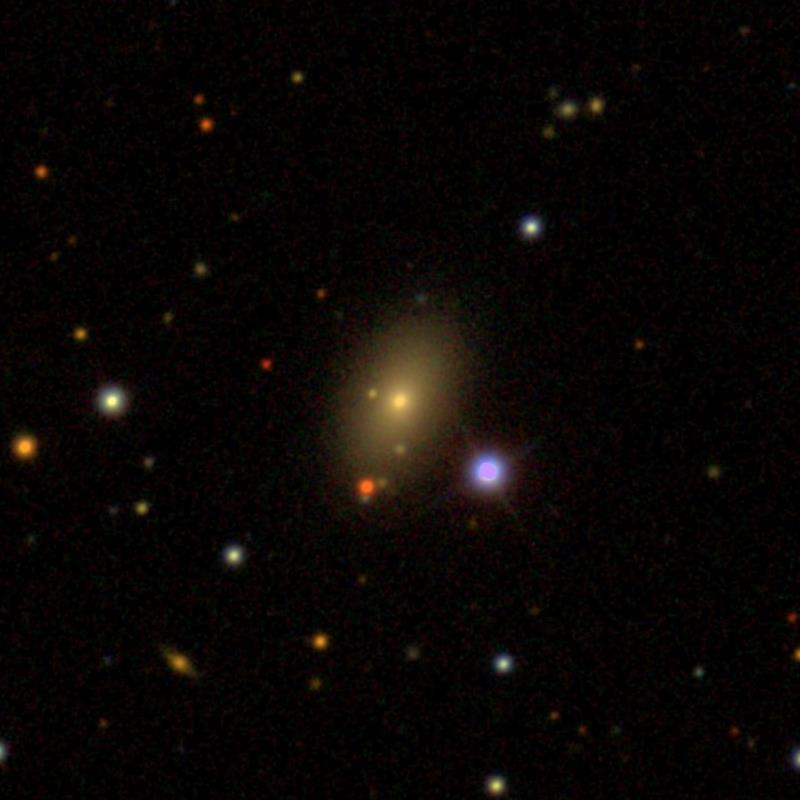
- NGC 149 by SDSS

Observation data (J2000 epoch)
- Constellation: Andromeda
- Right ascension: 00^{h} 33^{m} 50.245^{s}
- Declination: +30° 43′ 24.54″
- Redshift: 0.016155
- Heliocentric radial velocity: 4843
- Apparent magnitude (B): 14.69

Characteristics
- Type: S0:
- Size: 80,500 ly (24,690 pc)
- Apparent size (V): 1.2′ × 0.7′

Other designations
- UGC 332, MCG+05-02-024, PGC 2028

NGC 149 is a lenticular galaxy in the constellation Andromeda. It was discovered by Édouard Stephan on October 4, 1883.
