= NGC 213 =

Galaxy in the constellation Pisces

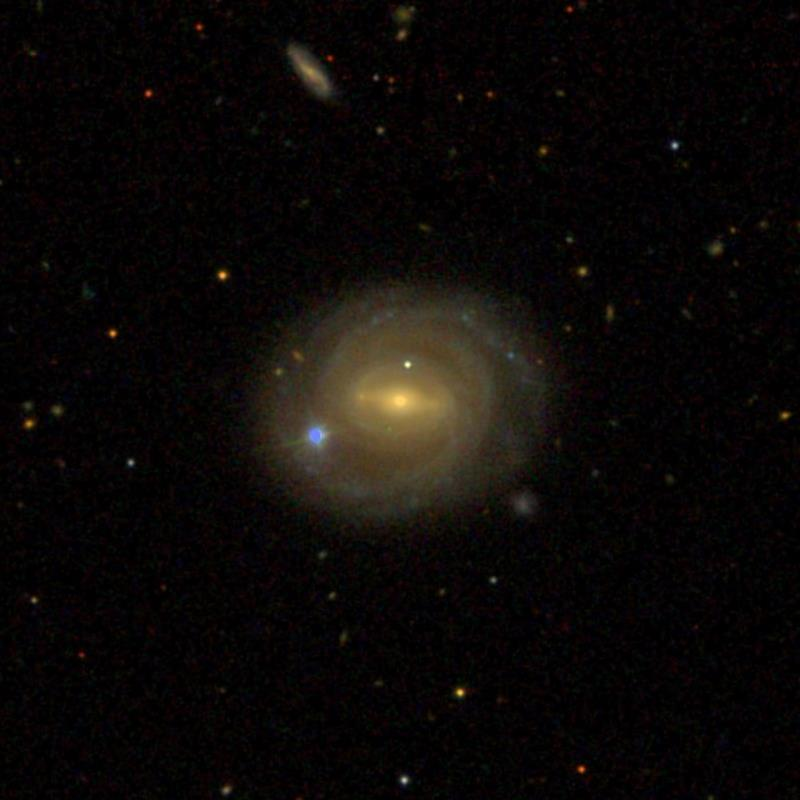
- SDSS image of NGC 213

Observation data (J2000 epoch)
- Constellation: Pisces
- Right ascension: 00^{h} 41^{m} 09.9940^{s}
- Declination: +16° 28′ 09.508″
- Redshift: 0.018166
- Distance: 245.7 ± 17.2 Mly (75.32 ± 5.28 Mpc)
- Apparent magnitude (V): 14.23

Characteristics
- Type: SB(rs)a
- Apparent size (V): 1.7' × 1.4'

Other designations
- IRAS F00384+1611, 2MASX J00411000+1628101, UGC 436, MCG +03-02-023, PGC 2469, CGCG 457-026

NGC 213 is a barred spiral galaxy located in the constellation Pisces. It was discovered on October 14, 1784, by William Herschel.

According to the SIMBAD database, NGC 213 is an Active Galaxy Nucleus Candidate, i.e. it has a compact region at the center of a galaxy that emits a significant amount of energy across the electromagnetic spectrum, with characteristics indicating that this luminosity is not produced by the stars.

== Supernova ==
One supernova has been observed in NGC 213:

- SN 2020bqm (Type Ia, mag. 18.389) was discovered by ATLAS on 2 February 2020.

== See also ==
- List of NGC objects (1–1000)
