= NGC 280 =

Spiral galaxy in constellation Andromeda

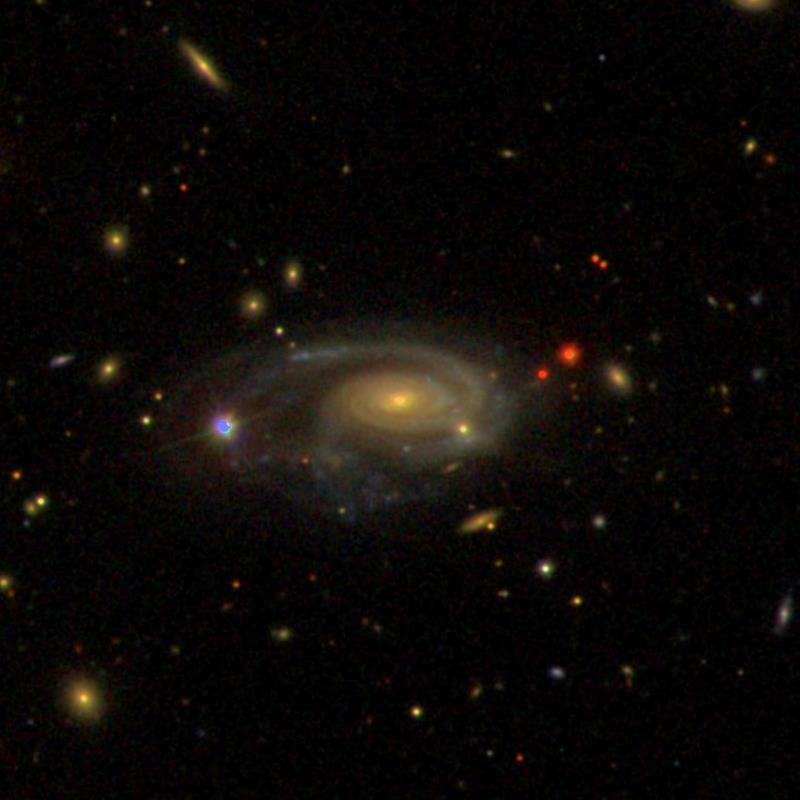
- SDSS image of NGC 280

Observation data (J2000 epoch)
- Constellation: Andromeda
- Right ascension: 00^{h} 52^{m} 30.2^{s}
- Declination: +24° 21′ 02″
- Redshift: 0.033707
- Heliocentric radial velocity: 3,878 km/s
- Apparent magnitude (V): 14.23

Characteristics
- Type: S
- Apparent size (V): 1.7' × 1.1'

Other designations
- UGC 00534, CGCG 480-017, MCG +04-03-013, 2MASX J00523026+2421022, 2MASXi J0052304+242102, IRAS 00498+2404, F00498+2404, PGC 3076.

NGC 280 is a spiral galaxy in the constellation Andromeda. It was discovered on December 5, 1785 by William Herschel.
