= List of stars in the New General Catalogue =

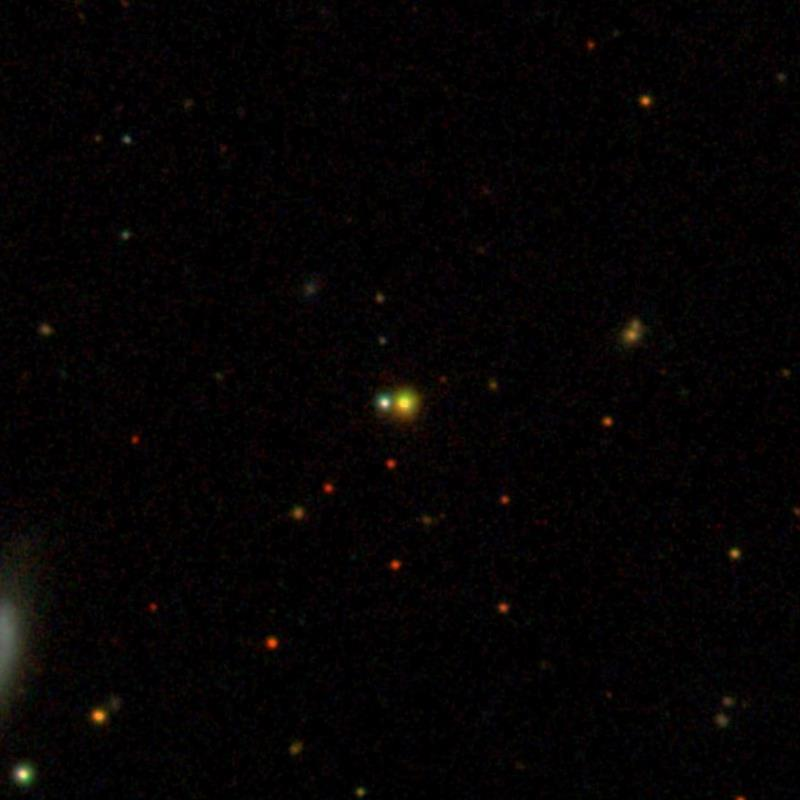
| NGC 8, a double star and asterism in the constellation Pegasus |

Some objects originally thought to be deep sky objects and listed in the New General Catalogue have been subsequently shown to be ordinary stars, so their inclusion in the catalog is now considered erroneous. This list of stars is based on the "NGC 2000.0" version of the catalog, which lists the stars in its errata, supplemented with data on each individual star from the VizieR database.

| NGC number | Image (click to enlarge) | Type | Discoverer | Constellation | Right ascension | Declination | Apparent Magnitude | References |
|---|---|---|---|---|---|---|---|---|
| 8 | | Double star | Otto Wilhelm | Pegasus | 00^{h} 08^{m} 45.3^{s} | 23° 50′ 20″ | 15.2/16.5 | |
| 18 | | Double star | Herman Schultz | Pegasus | 00^{h} 09^{m} 23.1^{s} | 27° 43′ 55″ | 14.0 | |
| 30 | | Double star | John Herschel | Pegasus | 00^{h} 11^{m} | 21° 57′ | 14.8/15 | |
| 32 | | Asterism | John Herschel | Pegasus | 00^{h} 11^{m} | 18° 47′ | 14 | |
| 33 | | Double star | John Herschel | Pisces | 00^{h} 11^{m} | 03° 40′ | 15 | |
| 44 | | Double Star | John Herschel | Andromeda | 00^{h} 13^{m} | 31° 18′ | 14.6 | |
| 46 | | Star | Edward Cooper | Pisces | 00^{h} 21.9^{m} | 22° 25′ | 11.8 | |
| 82 | | Star | Guillaume Bigourdan | Andromeda | 00^{h} 21^{m} 17.5^{s} | 22° 27′ 37″ | 14.6 | |
| 156 | | Double Star | Wilhelm Tempel | Cetus | 00^{h} 35^{m} | −08° 21′ | 14.4 | |
| 158 | | Double star | Wilhelm Tempel | Cetus | 00^{h} 35^{m} | −08° 19′ | | |
| 162 | | Star | Heinrich d'Arrest | Andromeda | 00^{h} 36^{m} 09.28^{s} | +23° 57′ 44.7″ | 15.06 | |
| 302 | | Star | Frank Muller | Cetus | 00^{h} 56^{m} | −10° 39′ | | |
| 308 | | Star | Robert Ball | Cetus | 00^{h} 56^{m} 34.33^{s} | −01° 47′ 03.6″ | 15.69 | |
| 310 | | Star | Robert Ball | Cetus | 00^{h} 57^{m} | −01° 46′ | | |
| 313 | | Triple star | Bindon Stoney | Pisces | 00^{h} 58^{m} | 30° 21′ | | |
| 316 | | Star | Bindon Stoney | Pisces | 00^{h} 58^{m} | 30° 21′ | | |
| 370 | | Triple star | Heinrich d'Arrest | Pisces | 01^{h} 06^{m} 44.6^{s} | 32° 25′ 43″ | | |
| 372 | | Triple star | John Dreyer | Pisces | 01^{h} 07^{m} | 32° 26′ | | |
| 390 | | Star | Guillaume Bigourdan | Pisces | 01^{h} 08^{m} 12.9^{s} | 32° 27′ 12″ | | |
| 400 | | Star | Robert Ball | Pisces | 01^{h} 09^{m} | 32° 44′ | | |
| 401 | | Star | Robert Ball | Pisces | 01^{h} 09^{m} | 32° 46′ | | |
| 402 | | Star | Lawrence Parsons | Pisces | 01^{h} 09^{m} | 32° 49′ | | |
| 405 | | Double star | John Herschel | Phoenix | 01^{h} 08^{m} | −46° 40′ | | |
| 408 | | Single star | Herman Schultz | Pisces | 01^{h} 11^{m} | 33° 06′ | | |
| 453 | | Triple star | Édouard Stephan | Pisces | 01^{h} 16^{m} 17.4^{s} | +33° 00′ 51″ | | |
| 464 | | Double star | Wilhelm Tempel | Andromeda | 01^{h} 19^{m} 26^{s} | +34° 57′ 21″ | | |
| 510 | | Double star | Herman Schultz | Pisces | 01^{h} 23^{m} 55.6^{s} | 33° 29′ 49″ | | |
| 616 | | Double star | Heinrich Louis d'Arrest | Triangulum | | | | |
| 730 | | star | | Pisces | 01^{h} 55^{m} | 05° 37′ | | |
| 764 | | Double star | Ormond Stone | Cetus | | | | |
| 1237 | | Double star | William Herschel | | | | | |
| 1240 | | Double star | | Aries | 03h 13m 26.7s | 03h 13m 26.7s +30° 30′ 26″ | | |
| 1276 | | Double star | John Dreyer | Perseus | 03h 19m 51.2s | 41° 38′ 29″ | 15 | |
| 1429 | | Star | | | | | | |
| 1443 | | Star | Wilhelm Tempel | | | | | |
| 1446 | | Star | John Louis Emil Dreyer | | | | | |
| 1717 | | Star | | | | | | |
| 1742 | | Star | Robert Stawell Ball | | | | | |
| 1988 | | Star | Jean Chacornac | Taurus | 05h 37m 26.5s | +21° 13′ 06″ | | |
| 2390 | | Star | Heinrich Louis d'Arrest | | | | | |
| 2436 | | Star | | | | | | |
| 2471 | | Double star | | | | | | |
| 2702 | | Star | | | | | | |
| 2705 | | Star | | | | | | |
| 2707 | | Star | | | | | | |
| 3339 | | Star | | | | | | |
| 4398 | | Star | | | | | | |
| 4582 | | Star | | | | | | |
| 4768 | | Star | | | | | | |
| 4769 | | Double star | | | | | | |
| 4844 | | Star | | | | | | |
| 4891 | | Star | | | | | | |
| 5067 | | Double Star | John Louis Emil Dreyer | Virgo | 13^{h} 18^{m} | −10° 08′ | | |
| 5086 | | Double Star | William Herschel | Centaurus | 13^{h} 20^{m} | −43° 44′ | | |
| 5160 | | Double Star | William Herschel | Virgo | 13^{h} 28^{m} | 05° 59′ | | |
| 5175 | | Star | William Herschel | Virgo | 13^{h} 29^{m} 26^{s} | 10° 59′ 42″ | | |
| 5200 | | Double Star | William Herschel | Virgo | 13^{h} 31^{m} | −00° 01′ | | |
| 5268 | | Star | Edward Joshua Cooper | Virgo | 13^{h} 42^{m} 12^{s} | −13° 51′ 34″ | 12.27 | |
| 5310 | | Star | William Herschel | Virgo | 13^{h} 49^{m} 47^{s} | 00° 04′ 09″ | | |
| 5404 | | Double Star | William Herschel | Virgo | 14^{h} 01^{m} | 00° 05′ | | |
| 5428 | | Double Star | William Herschel | Virgo | 14^{h} 03^{m} | −05° 59′ | | |
| 5429 | | Double star | William Herschel | Virgo | 14^{h} 03^{m} | −06° 02′ | | |
| 5432 | | Triple star | William Herschel | | | | | |
| 5435 | | Double star | William Herschel | Virgo | 14^{h} 04^{m} | −05° 55′ | | |
| 5465 | | Star | William Herschel | Virgo | 14^{h} 06^{m} 27^{s} | −05° 30′ 22″ | | |
| 5467 | | Star | William Herschel | Virgo | 14^{h} 06^{m} 29^{s} | −05° 28′ 53″ | | |
| 5524 | | Star | William Herschel | Boötes | 14^{h} 14^{m} 00^{s} | 36° 25′ 02″ | | |
| 5565 | | Star | William Herschel | Virgo | 14^{h} 19^{m} 18^{s} | 06° 59′ 41″ | | |
| 5724 | | Star | William Herschel | Boötes | 14^{h} 39^{m} 02^{s} | 46° 41′ 31″ | | |
| 5856 | | Double Star | William Herschel | Boötes | 15^{h} 07^{m} | 08° 26′ | | |
| 5871 | | Triple star | William Herschel | Virgo | 15^{h} 10^{m} 04^{s} | 00° 19′ 52″ | | |
| 5877 | | Double Star | William Herschel | Libra | 15^{h} 12^{m} | −04° 55′ | | |
| 5884 | | Double Star | William Herschel | Boötes | 15^{h} 13^{m} | 31° 51′ | | |
| 5901 | | Star | William Herschel | | | | | |
| 5948 | | Double Star | William Herschel | Serpens | 15^{h} 32^{m} | 03° 58′ | | |
| 6049 | | Star | William Herschel | Serpens | 16^{h} 05^{m} 37^{s} | 08° 05′ 46″ | | |
| 6059 | | Double Star | William Herschel | Ophiuchus | 16^{h} 06^{m} | −06° 23′ | | |
| 6092 | | Double Star | William Herschel | Corona Borealis | 16^{h} 14^{m} | 28° 07′ | | |
| 6199 | | Star | William Herschel | Hercules | 16^{h} 39^{m} 28^{s} | 36° 03′ 32″ | | |
| 6227 | | Star | William Herschel | Scorpius | 16^{h} 51^{m} 33^{s} | −41° 13′ 49″ | | |
| 6294 | | Double Star | William Herschel | Ophiuchus | 17^{h} 10^{m} | −26° 34′ | | |
| 6344 | | Double Star | William Herschel | Hercules | 17^{h} 17^{m} | 42° 26′ | | |
| 6406 | | Double Star | William Herschel | Hercules | 17^{h} 38^{m} | 18° 49′ | | |
| 6410 | | Double star | William Herschel | Draco | 17^{h} 35^{m} | 60° 47′ | | |
| 6428 | | Double Star | William Herschel | Hercules | 17^{h} 43^{m} | 25° 33′ | | |
| 6499 | | Double Star | William Herschel | Hercules | 17^{h} 55^{m} | 18° 21′ | | |
| 6519 | | Double Star | William Herschel | Sagittarius | 18^{h} 03^{m} | −29° 48′ | | |
| 6655 | | Double Star | William Herschel | Scutum | 18^{h} 34^{m} | −05° 55′ | | |
| 6672 | | Double Star | William Herschel | Lyra | 18^{h} 36^{m} | 42° 56′ | | |
| 6731 | | Double Star | William Herschel | Lyra | 18^{h} 57^{m} | 43° 04′ | | |
| 6767 | | Double Star | William Herschel | Lyra | 19^{h} 11^{m} | 37° 43′ | | |
| 6896 | | Double Star | William Herschel | Cygnus | 20^{h} 18^{m} | 30° 38′ | | |
| 6933 | | Star | William Herschel | Delphinus | 20^{h} 33^{m} 38^{s} | 07° 23′ 14″ | | |
| 6963 | | Double Star | William Herschel | Aquarius | 20^{h} 47^{m} | 00° 30′ | | |
| 6966 | | Double Star | William Herschel | Aquarius | 20^{h} 47^{m} | 00° 22′ | | |
| 6973 | | Star | William Herschel | | | | | |
| 6980 | | Star | William Herschel | | | | | |
| 7045 | | Double Star | William Herschel | Equuleus | 20^{h} 14^{m} | 04° 30′ | | |
| 7114 | | Star | Johann Friedrich Julius Schmidt | Cygnus | 21^{h} 41^{m} 44^{s} | 42° 50′ 30″ | 3.0 - 15.6 | |
| 7136 | | Double Star | William Herschel | Capricornus | 21^{h} 49^{m} | −11° 47′ | | |
| 7148 | | Double Star | William Herschel | Pegasus | 21^{h} 52^{m} | 03° 20′ | | |
| 7325 | | Double Star | William Herschel | Pegasus | 22^{h} 36^{m} | 34° 22′ | | |
| 7326 | | Double Star | William Herschel | Pegasus | 22^{h} 36^{m} | 34° 25′ | | |
| 7333 | | Star | William Herschel | Pegasus | 22^{h} 37^{m} 11^{s} | 34° 26′ 16″ | | |
| 7338 | | Double Star | William Herschel | Pegasus | 22^{h} 37^{m} | 34° 24′ | | |
| 7350 | | Double Star | William Herschel | Pegasus | 22^{h} 40^{m} | 12° 00′ | | |
| 7560 | | Double Star | William Herschel | Pisces | 23^{h} 15^{m} | 04° 29′ | | |
| 7607 | | Double Star | William Herschel | Pegasus | 23^{h} 18^{m} | 11° 20′ | | |
| 7748 | | Star | William Herschel | Cepheus | 23^{h} 44^{m} 56^{s} | 69° 45′ 17″ | | |
| 7791 | | Double Star | William Herschel | Pegasus | 23^{h} 57^{m} | 10° 45′ | 12.9 | |

== See also ==
- List of NGC objects
