= NGC 7771 =

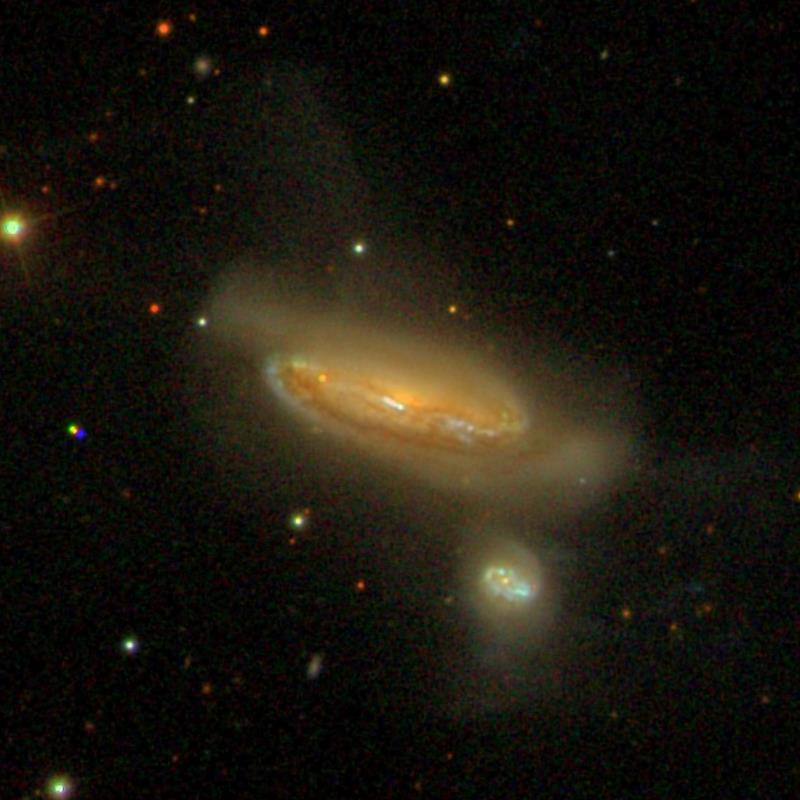
- Image of NGC 7771

Observation data (J2000 epoch)
- Constellation: Pegasus
- Right ascension: 23^{h} 51^{m} 24.8672^{s}
- Declination: +20° 06′ 42.368″
- Redshift: 0.014460±0.0000007
- Heliocentric radial velocity: 4,335±2 km/s
- Apparent magnitude (V): 12.25

Characteristics
- Type: SB(s)a
- Size: ~595,900 ly (182.70 kpc) (estimated)

Other designations
- UGC 12815, PGC 72638

NGC 7771 (also known as UGC 12815) is a spiral galaxy in the constellation Pegasus. It was discovered on Sep 18, 1784 by German-British astronomer William Herschel, and also observed on Aug 25, 1827 by his son, John Herschel. The galaxy is receding from the Milky Way with a line of sight velocity component of 4,335 km/s. It has an apparent visual magnitude of 12.25, requiring a telescope to view.

The morphological classification of NGC 7771 is SB(s)a, which indicates the galaxy has a barred spiral shape (SB) with no ring structure (s) and tightly wound spiral arms (a).

== Interacting Galaxies ==
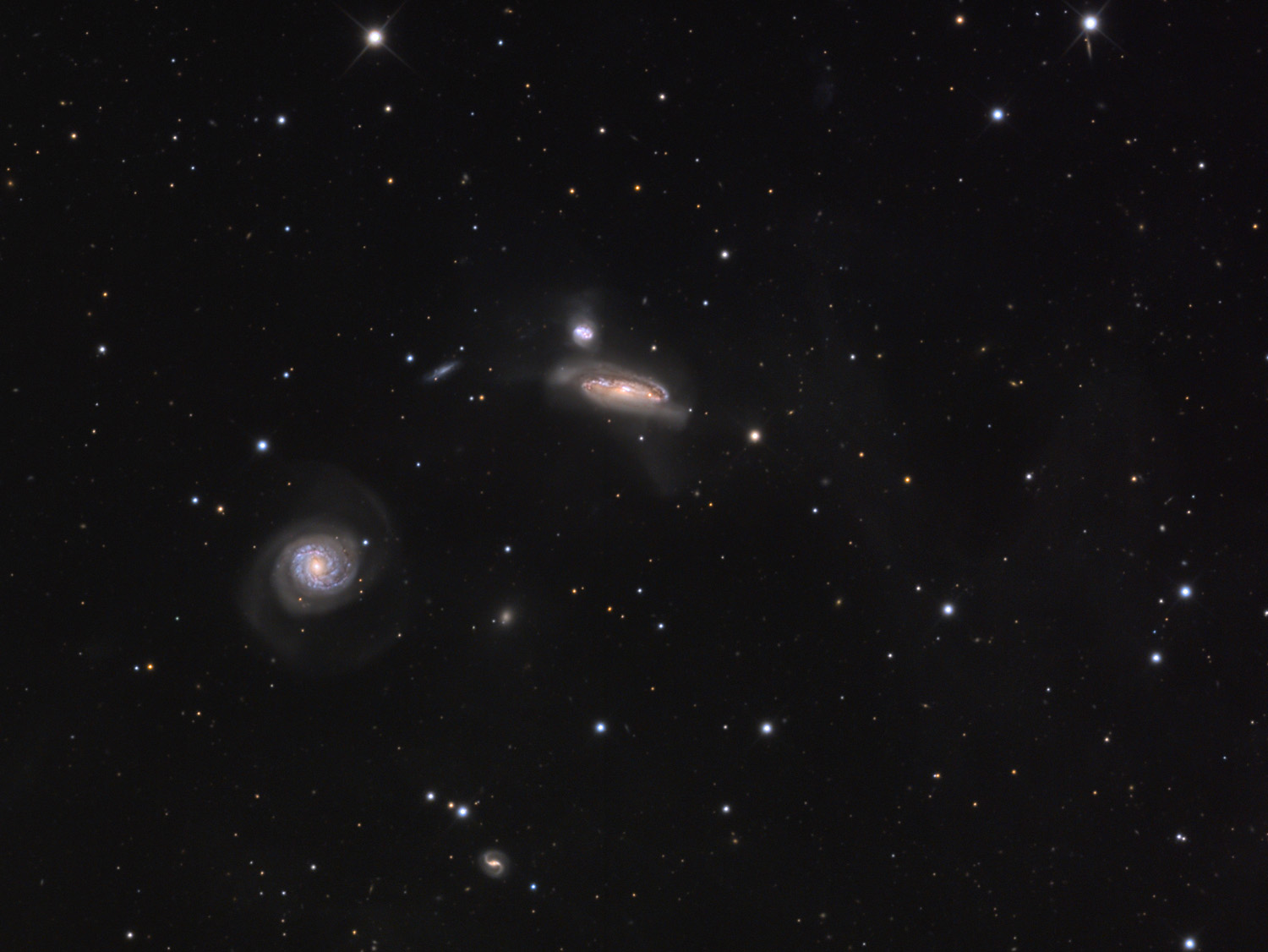
Image of galaxies NGC 7769 in left and NGC 7770/7771 on the right

NGC 7771 forms a triplet of galaxies in gravitational interaction with its neighbors NGC 7770 and NGC 7769. The main galaxy of the group, NGC 7771, underwent a close encounter with the spiral galaxy NGC 7769 and another more recently with NGC 7770. NGC 7769 appears today, viewed from Earth, farther from the other two, but the possibility of a second encounter between it and NGC 7771 in the distant future is not excluded.

== NGC 7771 group ==
According to AM Garcia, NGC 7771 is a member of the NGC 7771 galaxy group, a small galaxy group in the Virgo Supercluster. The NGC 7771 group includes at least 4 members, namely NGC 7769, NGC 7770, NGC 7771 and NGC 7786.

== Supernova ==
One supernovae have been observed in NGC 7771:

- SN 2003hg (Type II, mag. 16.9) was discovered by the by M. Moore and W. Li as part of the LOTOSS program at the Lick Observatory on 18 August 2003.

== See also ==
- List of NGC objects (7001-7840)
- List of NGC objects
