= NGC 7770 =

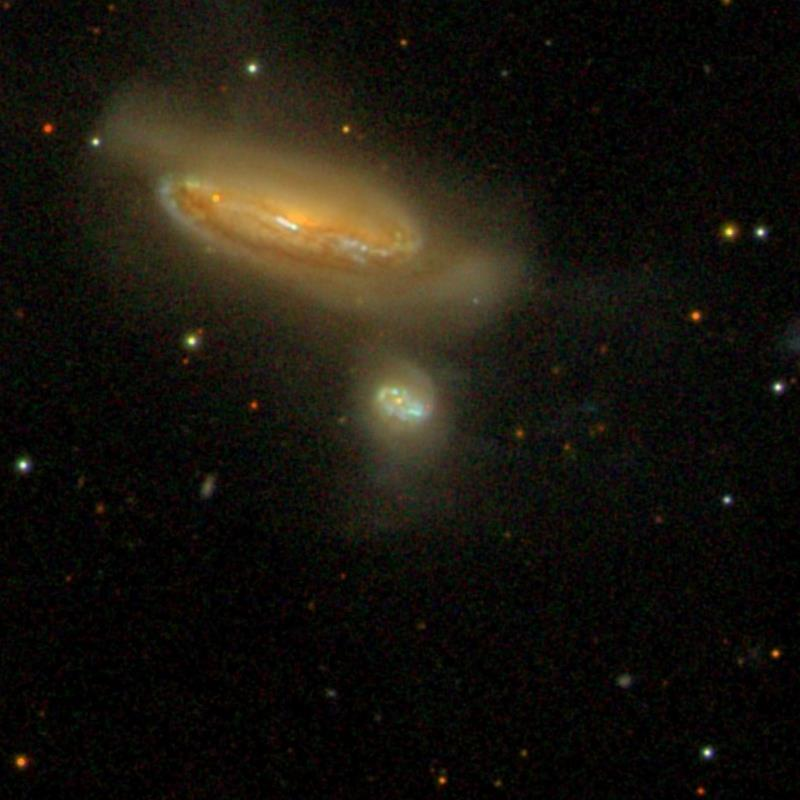
- Image of NGC 7770

Observation data (J2000 epoch)
- Constellation: Pegasus
- Right ascension: 23^{h} 51^{m} 22.6152^{s}
- Declination: +20° 05′ 48.451″
- Redshift: 0.014150 ± 0.0000019
- Heliocentric radial velocity: 4242 ± 6 km/s
- Apparent magnitude (V): 14.5

Characteristics
- Type: S0/a?
- Size: ~210,000 ly (65 kpc) (estimated)

Other designations
- PGC 72635

NGC 7770 (also known as PGC 72635) is a lenticular galaxy in the constellation Pegasus. It was discovered on November 5, 1850 by Bindon Stoney

== Interacting Galaxies ==
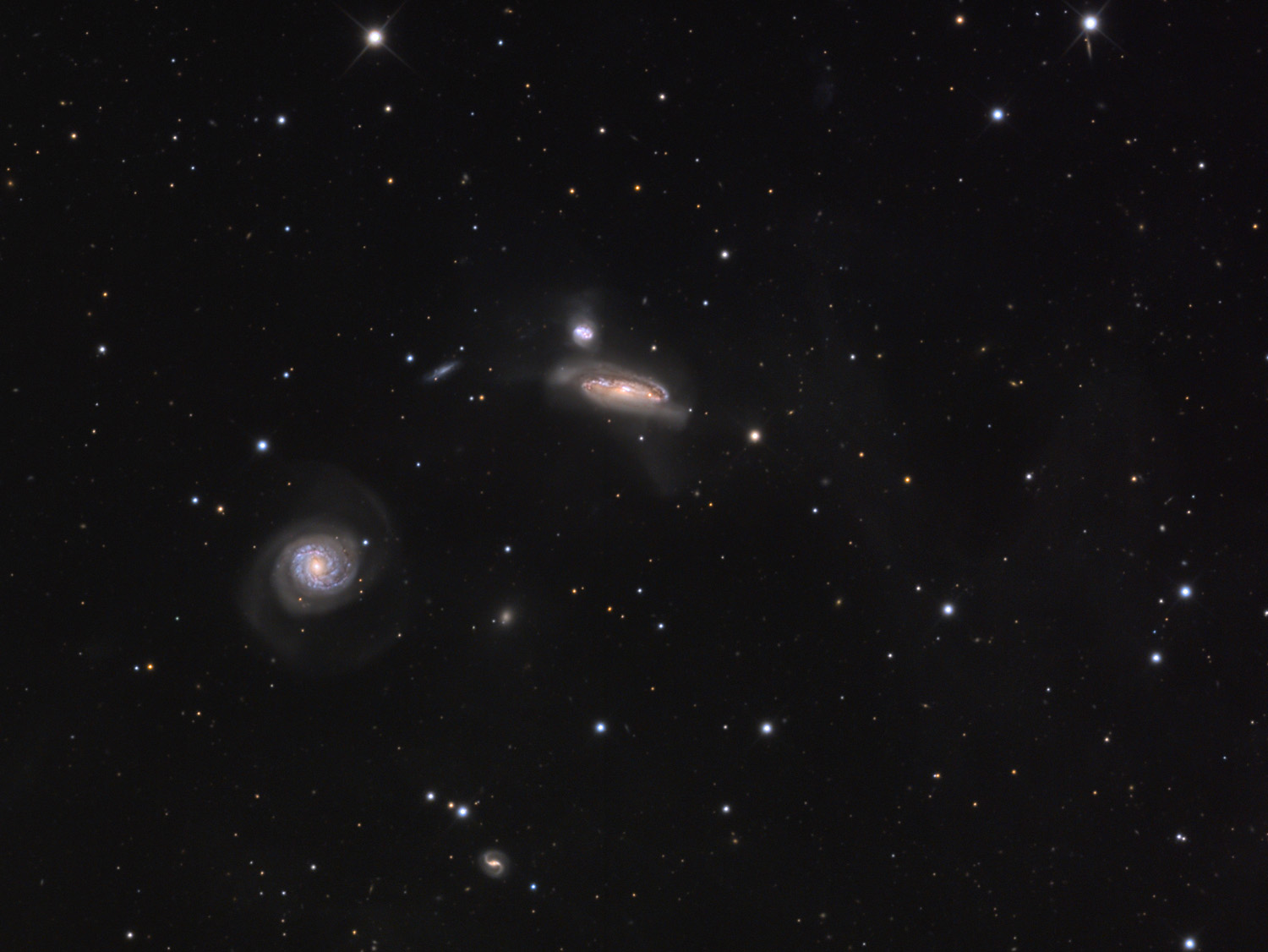
Image of galaxies NGC 7769 in left and NGC 7770/7771 on the right

NGC 7770 forms a triplet of galaxies in gravitational interaction with its neighbors NGC 7769 and NGC 7771. The main galaxy of the group, NGC 7771, underwent a close encounter with the spiral galaxy NGC 7769 and another more recently with NGC 7770. NGC 7769 appears today, viewed from Earth, farther from the other two, but the possibility of a second encounter between it and NGC 7771 in the distant future is not excluded.

== NGC 7771 group ==
According to AM Garcia, NGC 7770 is a member of the NGC 7771 galaxy group, a small galaxy group in the Virgo Supercluster. The NGC 7771 group includes at least 4 members, namely NGC 7769, NGC 7770, NGC 7771 and NGC 7786.

== See also ==
- List of NGC objects (7001-7840)
- List of NGC objects
