= NGC 6394 =

Galaxy in the constellation Draco

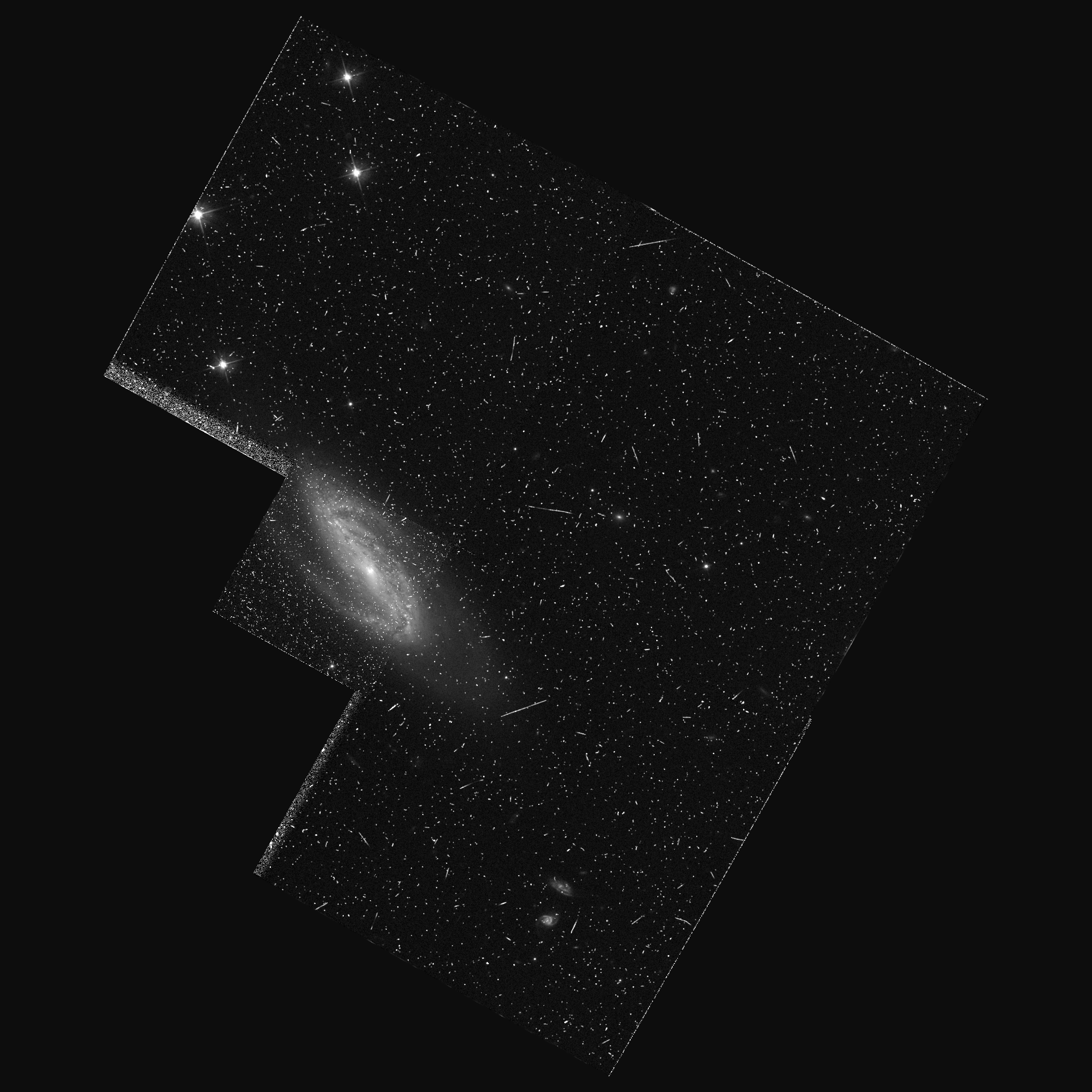
- NGC 6394 as seen through the Hubble Space Telescope

Observation data (J2000 epoch)
- Constellation: Draco
- Right ascension: 17^{h} 30^{m} 21.4^{s}
- Declination: +59° 38′ 24″
- Redshift: 0.028306±0.000064
- Heliocentric radial velocity: 8486±19 km/s
- Galactocentric velocity: 8684±21 km/s
- Distance: 390 million light years (119 million parsecs)
- Apparent magnitude (V): 13.416 +/- 0.002
- Absolute magnitude (V): -21.94 +/- 0.50

Characteristics
- Type: SBb
- Size: 159,000 light years
- Apparent size (V): 1.40′ × 0.4′

Other designations
- UGC 10889, MCG 10-25-55, ZWG 300.45, PGC 60410 and IRAS17296+5940
- References: NASA/IPAC extragalactic datatbase, http://spider.seds.org/

NGC 6394 is a barred spiral galaxy located in the constellation Draco. It is designated as SBb in the galaxy morphological classification scheme and was discovered by the American astronomer Lewis A. Swift on 7 July 1885.

== See also ==
- List of NGC objects (6001–7000)
- List of NGC objects
