= NGC 35 =

Spiral galaxy in the constellation Cetus

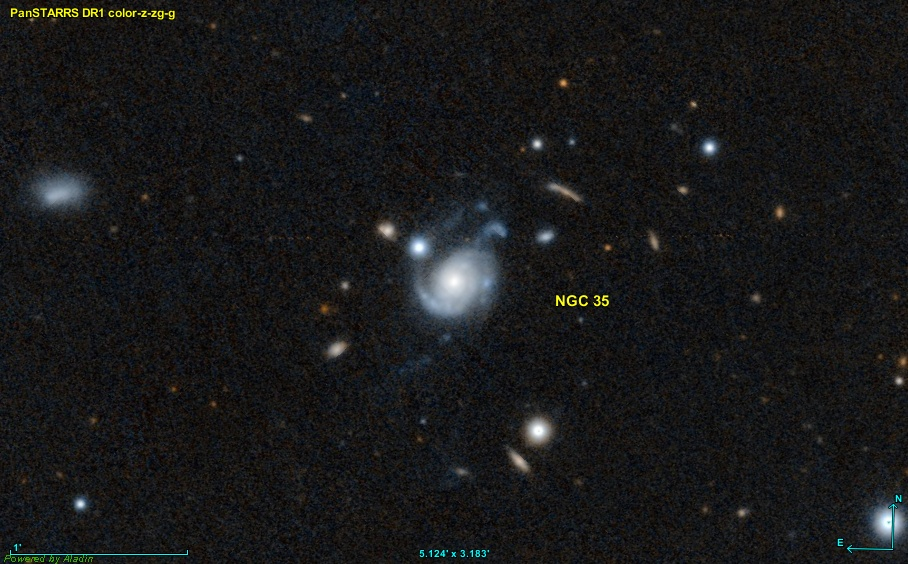
- Pan-STARRS image of NGC 35

Observation data (J2000 epoch)
- Constellation: Cetus
- Right ascension: 00^{h} 11^{m} 10.49324^{s}
- Declination: −12° 01′ 14.6953″
- Redshift: 0.020096
- Heliocentric radial velocity: 5964 km/s
- Distance: 273.8 Mly (83.95 Mpc)

Characteristics
- Type: Sb

Other designations
- MCG -02-01-033, PGC 784

NGC 35 is a spiral galaxy in the constellation Cetus. It was discovered on November 21, 1886 by the astronomer Lewis A. Swift.

== See also ==
- NGC
- List of NGC objects (1–1000)
- List of NGC objects
- Galaxy
