= NGC 6285 =

Galaxy in the constellation Draco

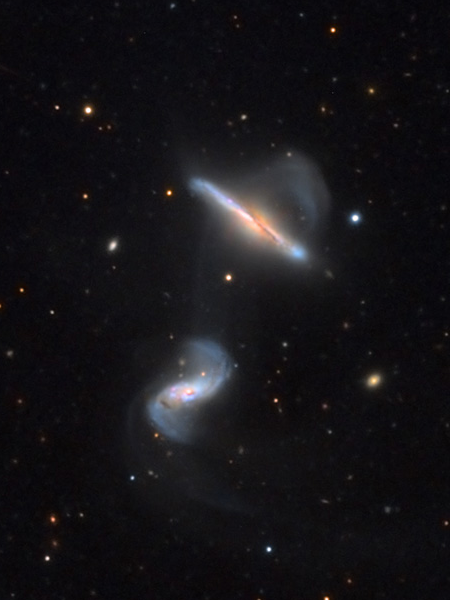
- NGC 6285 (below) and NGC 6286 (above) as seen through the 0.81 m Schulman Telescope at Mount Lemmon Observatory.

Observation data (J2000 epoch)
- Constellation: Draco
- Right ascension: 16^{h} 58^{m} 24.0^{s}
- Declination: +58° 57′ 21″
- Redshift: 0.018983±0.000160
- Heliocentric radial velocity: 5691±48 km/s
- Galactocentric velocity: 5880±49 km/s
- Distance: 262 million light years (80.2 million parsecs)
- Apparent magnitude (V): 13.6

Characteristics
- Type: S0-a
- Size: 91,000 light years
- Apparent size (V): 1.20′ × 0.7′

Other designations
- MCG 10-24-81, ZWG 299.37, ARP 293, PGC 59344 and KAZ 111
- References: NASA/IPAC extragalactic datatbase, http://spider.seds.org/

NGC 6285 is an interacting spiral galaxy located in the constellation Draco. It is classified as S0-a in the galaxy morphological classification scheme and was discovered by the American astronomer Lewis A. Swift in 1886. NGC 6285 is located at about 262 million light years away from Earth. NGC 6285 and NGC 6286 form a pair of interacting galaxies, with tidal distortions, categorized as Arp 293 in the Arp Atlas of Peculiar Galaxies.

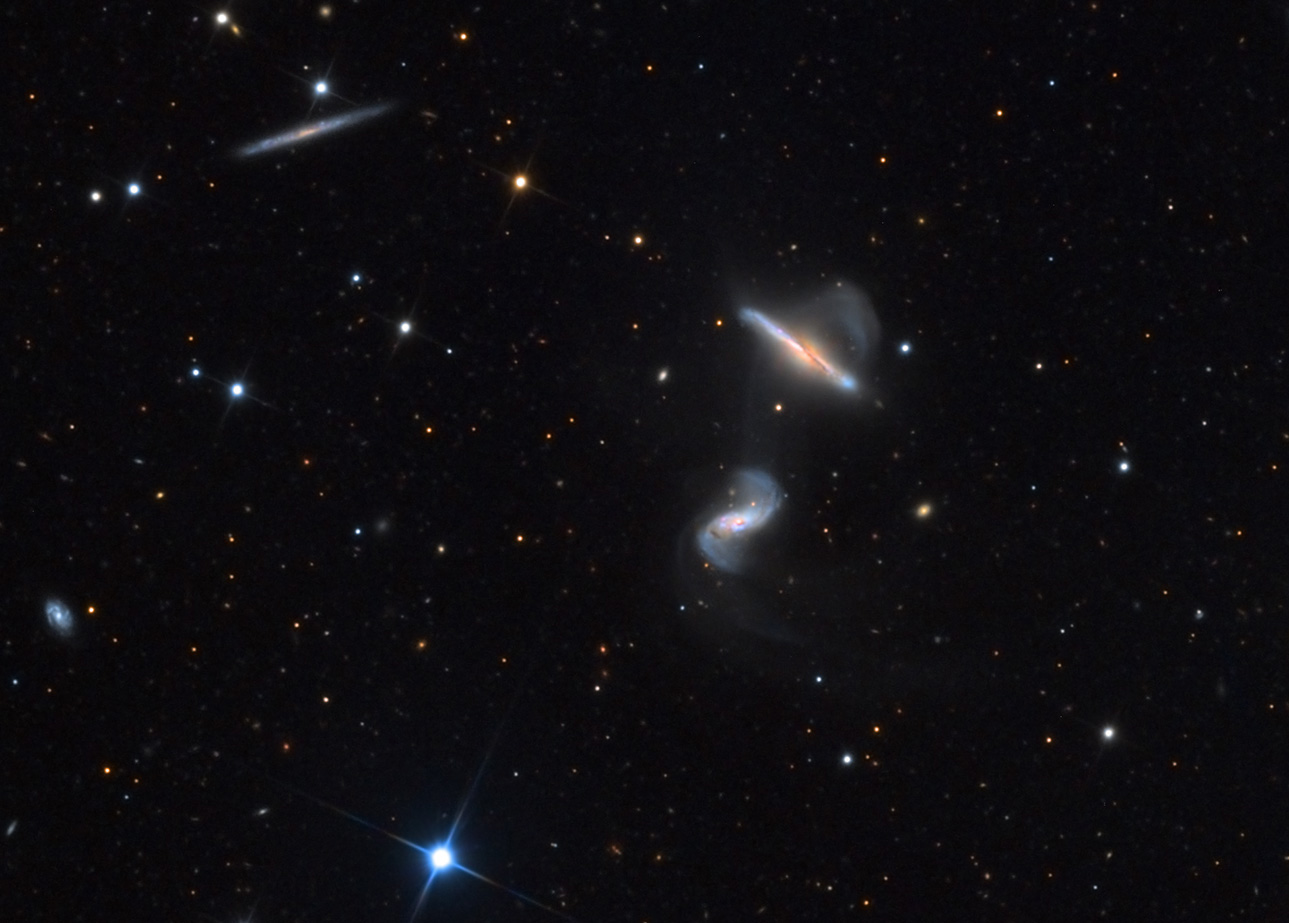
An uncropped version of the image showing the interacting galaxies and UGC 10641, a flat galaxy at the top left area

== See also ==
- List of NGC objects (6001–7000)
- List of NGC objects
