= NGC 6286 =

Galaxy in the constellation Draco

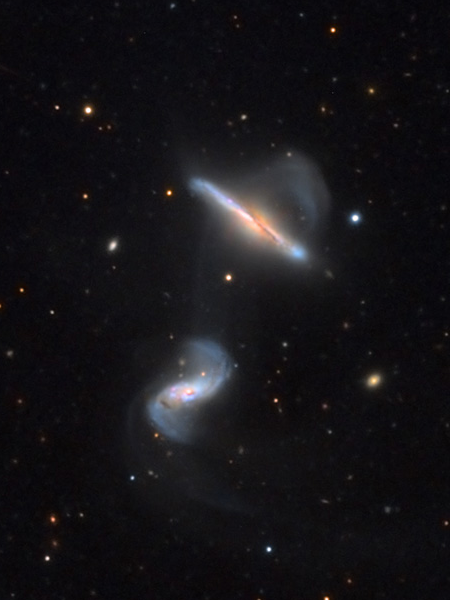
- NGC 6286 (above) and NGC 6285 (below) as seen through the 0.81 m Schulman Telescope at Mount Lemmon Observatory.

Observation data (J2000 epoch)
- Constellation: Draco
- Right ascension: 16^{h} 58^{m} 31.4^{s}
- Declination: +58° 56′ 11″
- Redshift: 0.018349±0.000053
- Heliocentric radial velocity: 5501±16 km/s
- Galactocentric velocity: 5689±18 km/s
- Distance: 252 million light years (77.5 million parsecs)
- Apparent magnitude (V): 12.05
- Absolute magnitude (V): −22.36

Characteristics
- Type: Sb/P
- Size: 96,000 light years
- Apparent size (V): 1.30′ × 1.2′

Other designations
- UGC 10647, MCG 10-24-84, ZWG 299.40, PGC 59352, ARP 293, IRAS16577+5900 and PRC C-51
- References: NASA/IPAC extragalactic datatbase, http://spider.seds.org/

NGC 6286 is an interacting spiral galaxy located in the constellation Draco. It is designated as Sb/P in the galaxy morphological classification scheme and was discovered by the American astronomer Lewis A. Swift on 13 August 1885. NGC 6286 is located at about 252 million light years away from Earth. NGC 6286 and NGC 6285 form a pair of interacting galaxies, with tidal distortions, categorized as Arp 293 in the Arp Atlas of Peculiar Galaxies.

== Gallery ==
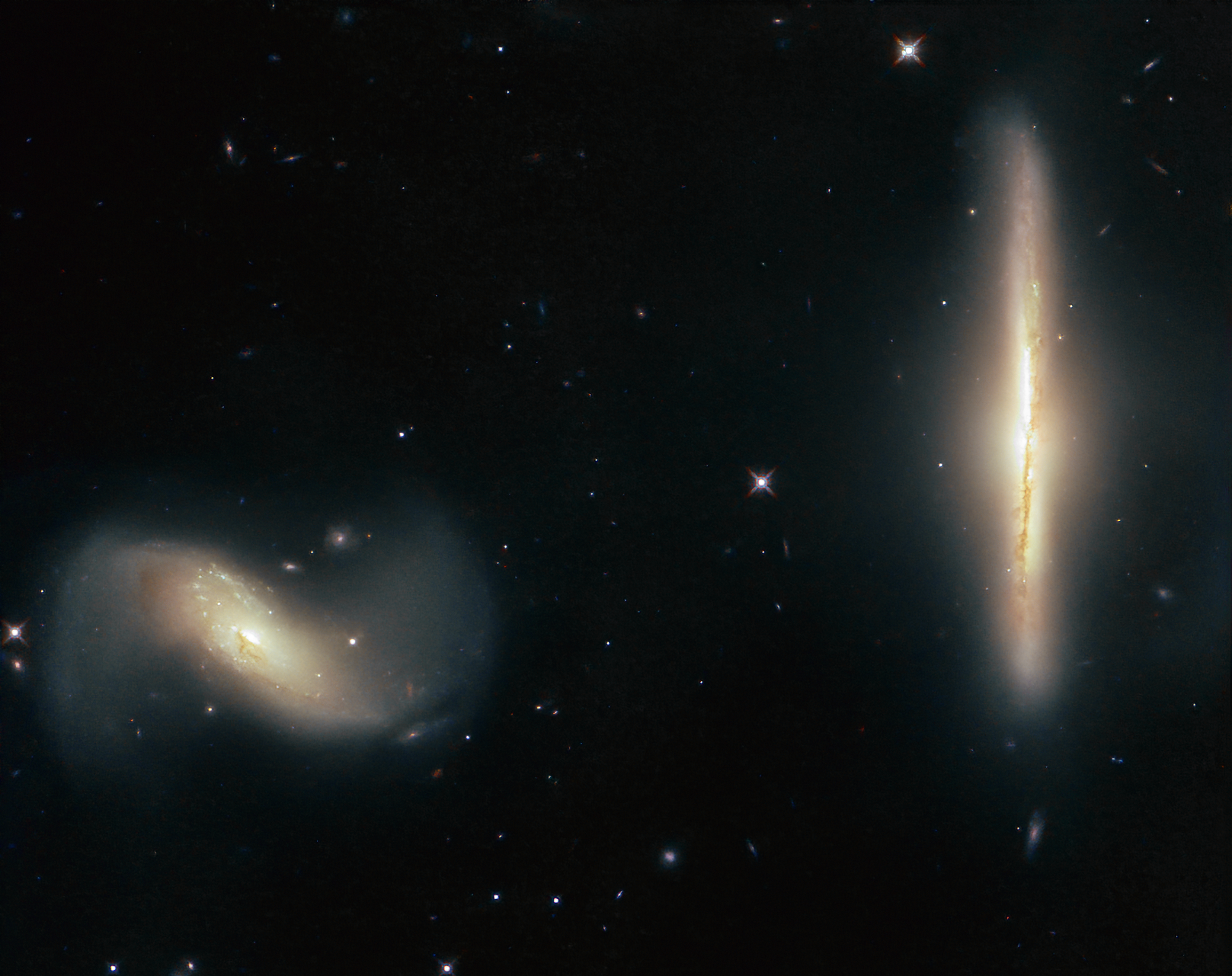
NGC 6286 and NGC 6285 are named Arp 293.

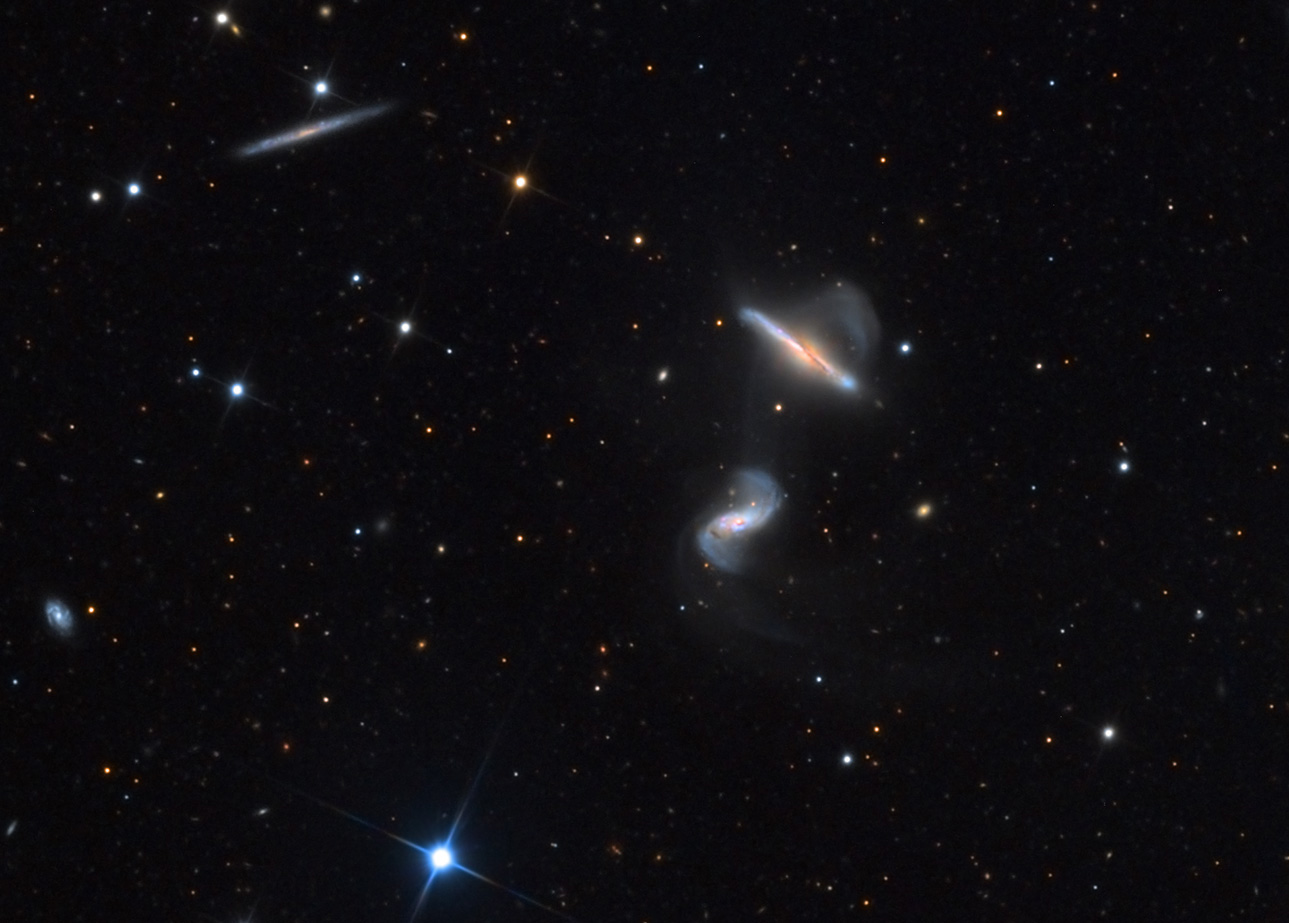
An uncropped version of the image showing the interacting galaxies and UGC 10641, a flat galaxy at the top left area.

== See also ==
- List of NGC objects (6001–7000)
- List of NGC objects
