= NGC 1521 =

Galaxy in the constellation Edrianus

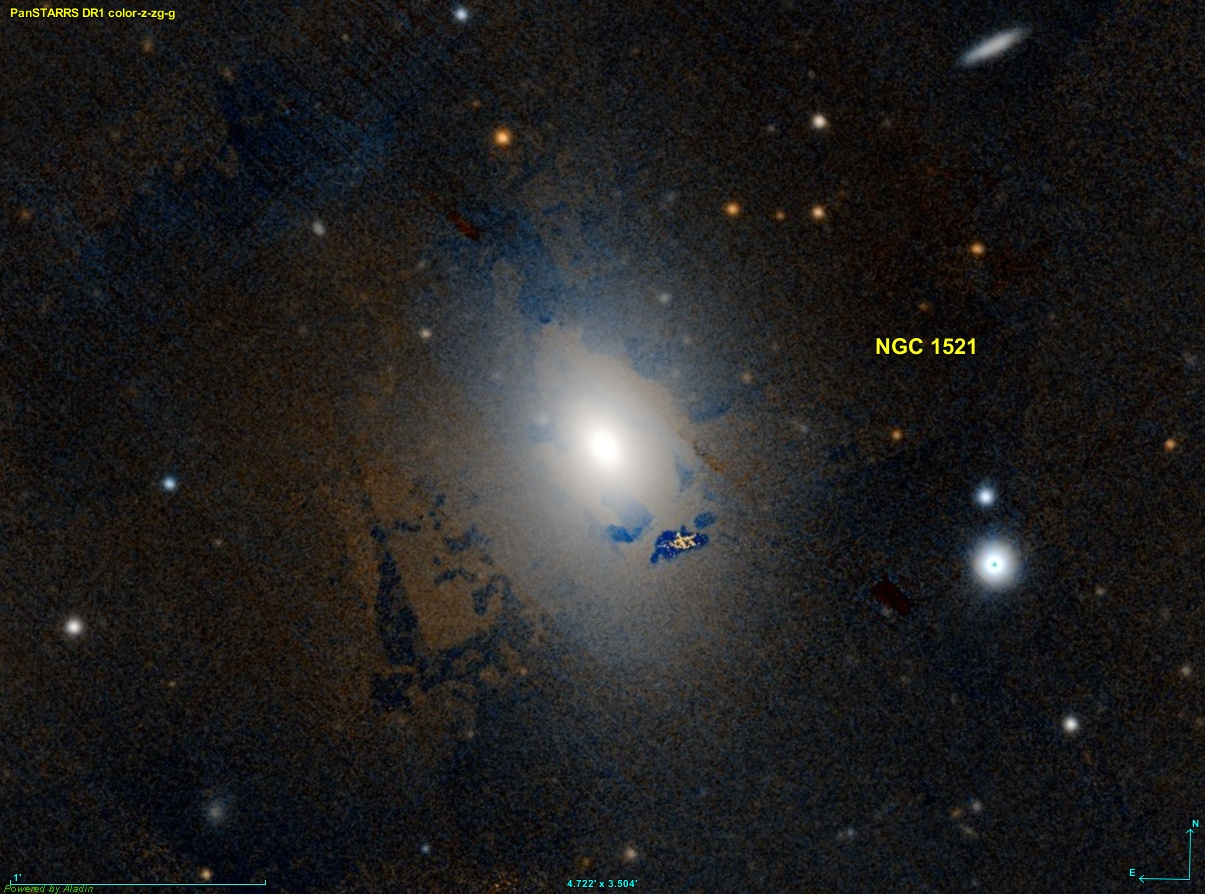
- Image of NGC 1521

Observation data (J2000 epoch)
- Constellation: Eridanus
- Right ascension: 4^{h} 04^{m} 18.9263^{s}
- Declination: −21° 03′ 07.151″
- Redshift: 0.014153 ± 0.000004
- Heliocentric radial velocity: 4243 ± 12 km/s
- Apparent magnitude (V): 12.31

Characteristics
- Type: E3?
- Size: ~470,700 ly (144.33 kpc) (estimated)

Other designations
- WISEA J040818.92-210307.1, PGC 14520

NGC 1521 (also known as PGC 14520) is an elliptical galaxy in the constellation Eridanus. It was discovered on November 21, 1835, by John Herschel.

== See also ==
- List of NGC objects (1001-2000)
- List of NGC objects
