= NGC 6677 =

Spiral galaxy in the constellation Draco

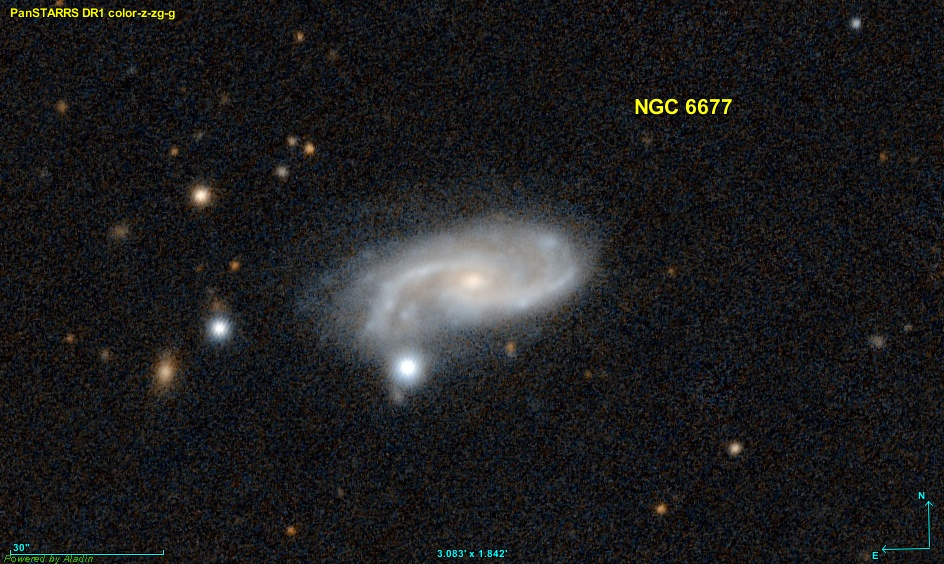
- Image of NGC 6677

Observation data (J2000 epoch)
- Constellation: Draco
- Right ascension: 18^{h} 33^{m} 36.2020^{s}
- Declination: +67° 06′ 38.041″
- Redshift: 0.022259 ± 0.0000067
- Heliocentric radial velocity: 6673 ± 20 km/s
- Apparent magnitude (V): 13.5

Characteristics
- Type: S?
- Size: ~280,000 ly (85 kpc) (estimated)

Other designations
- IC 4763, UGC 11290

NGC 6677 (also known as UGC 11290) is a spiral galaxy in the constellation Draco. It was discovered June 8, 1885 by Lewis Swift.

== See also ==
- List of NGC objects (1001-2000)
- List of NGC objects
