= NGC 158 =

Double star in the constellation Cetus

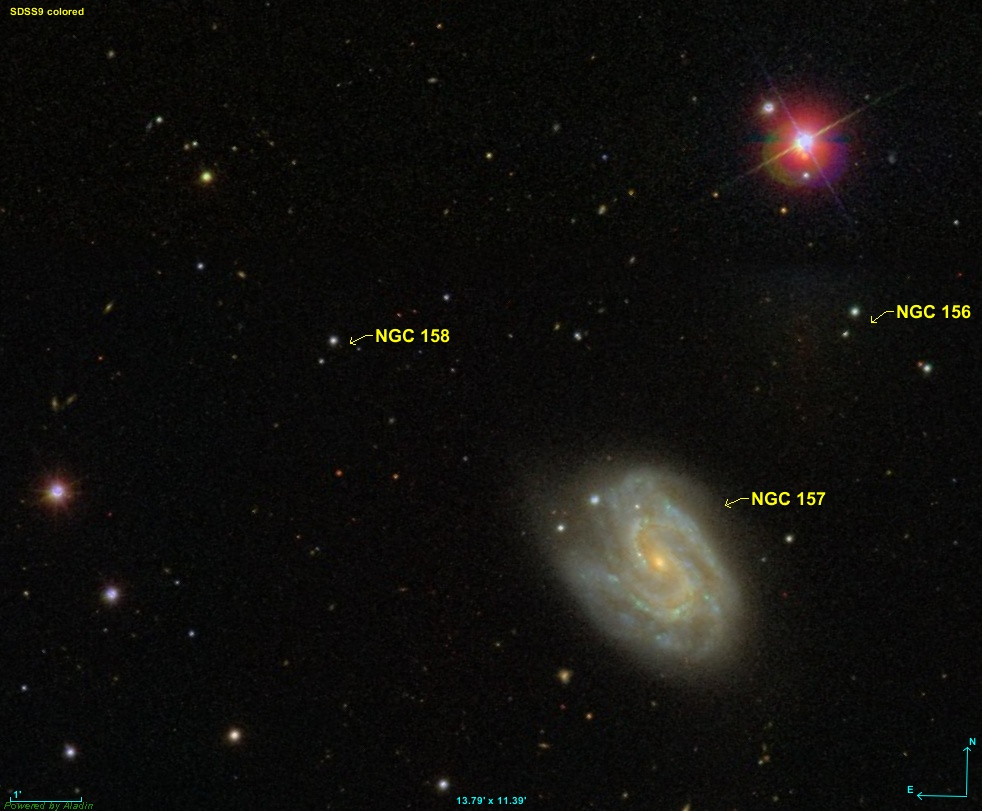
- SDSS image of NGC 158

Observation data Epoch J2000 Equinox ICRS
- Constellation: Cetus
- Right ascension: 00^{h} 35^{m} 05.6^{s}
- Declination: −08° 20′ 45″

NGC 158 is a double star in the constellation Cetus. It was discovered by Wilhelm Tempel in 1882.

== See also ==
- Double star
- List of NGC objects
