= NGC 162 =

Star in the constellation Andromeda

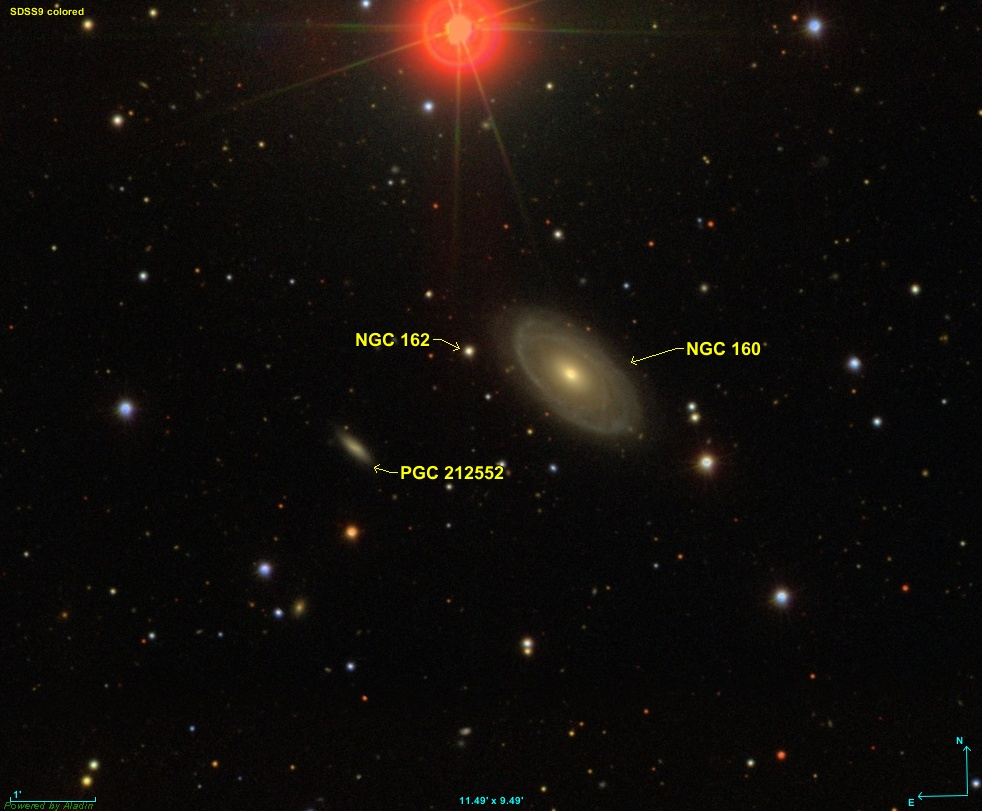
- SDSS image of NGC 162

Observation data Epoch J2000 Equinox ICRS
- Constellation: Andromeda
- Right ascension: 00^{h} 36^{m} 09.28^{s}
- Declination: +23° 57′ 44.7″
- Apparent magnitude (V): 15.06

Astrometry
| Radial velocity (R_{v}) | −29.41±4.71 km/s |
| Proper motion (μ) | RA: 8.467 mas/yr Dec.: -6.142 mas/yr |
| Parallax (π) | 1.8883±0.0246 mas |
| Distance | 1,730 ± 20 ly (530 ± 7 pc) |

Other designations
- NGC 162, UCAC2 40124152

Database references
| SIMBAD | data |

NGC 162 is a star in the constellation Andromeda. It was discovered by Heinrich d'Arrest in 1862. A few galaxies (PGC 2148 and PGC 212552) have been mis-identified as NGC 162.

== See also ==
- Double star
- List of NGC objects
