= NGC 156 =

Double star in the constellation Cetus

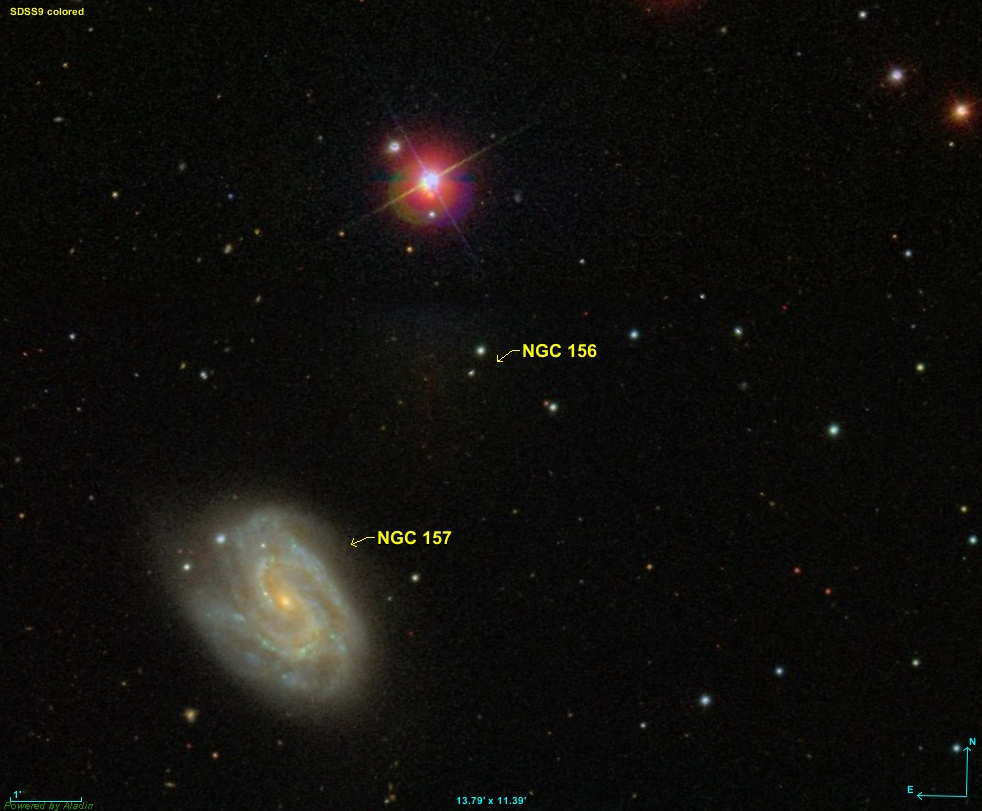
- SDSS image of NGC 156 (just left of the center) with nearby galaxy NGC 157

Observation data Epoch J2000 Equinox ICRS
- Constellation: Cetus
- Right ascension: 00^{h} 34^{m} 35.8^{s}
- Declination: −08° 20′ 24″

NGC 156 is a double star located in the constellation Cetus. It was discovered in 1882 by Ernst Wilhelm Leberecht Tempel.

== See also ==
- New General Catalogue
- List of NGC objects
