= NGC 408 =

Star in the constellation Pisces

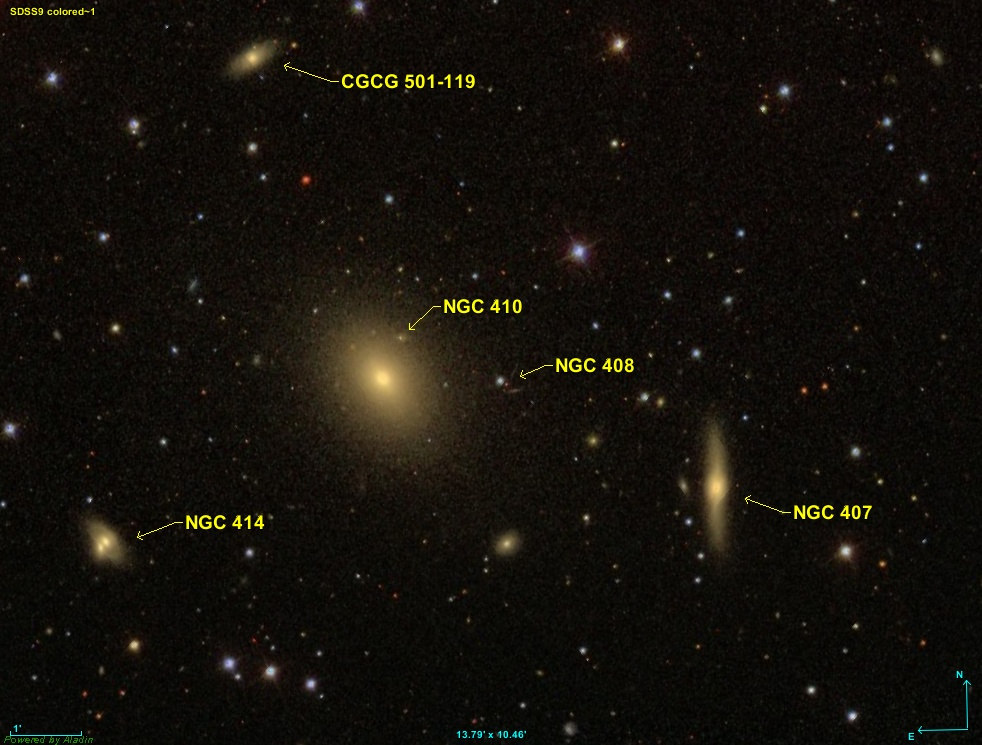
- NGC 408 as seen on SDSS

Observation data Epoch J2000 Equinox ICRS
- Constellation: Pisces
- Right ascension: 01^{h} 10^{m} 51.1^{s}
- Declination: +33° 09′ 05″
- Apparent magnitude (V): 14.5

NGC 408 is a star located in the constellation Pisces. It was discovered on October 22, 1867, by Herman Schultz. It was described by Dreyer as "very faint, very small, (WH) II 220 eight seconds of time to east.", WH II 220 being NGC 410.

== See also ==
- List of NGC objects (1–1000)
- Pisces (constellation)
