= NGC 510 =

Double star in the constellation Pisces

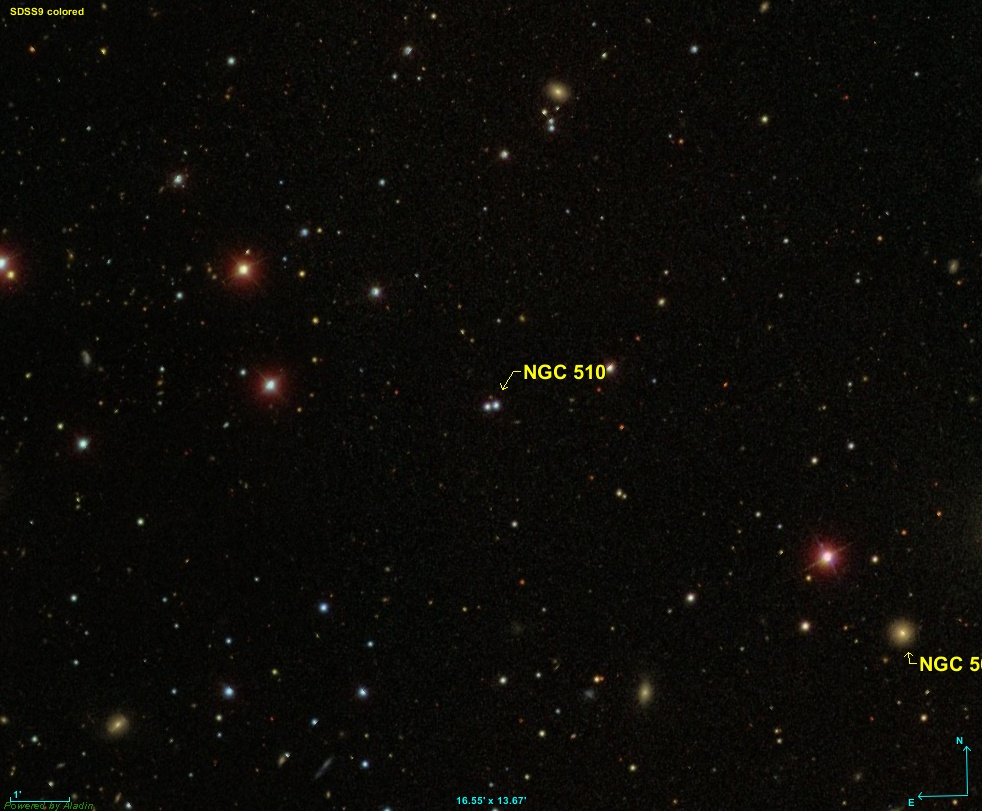
- NGC 510; Credit: (SDSS)

Observation data Epoch J2000.0 Equinox ICRS
- Constellation: Pisces
- Right ascension: 01^{h} 23^{m} 55.56^{s}
- Declination: 33° 29′ 48.80″
- Apparent magnitude (V): 14.9 and 15.1

Other designations
- GC 5173

NGC 510 is a double star in the constellation of Pisces. The stars are separated 8", and located 7' ESE of NGC 499 and 9' WNW of NGC 515.

The RNGC mislabels PGC 5102 as NGC 510.

== Observational history ==
NGC 510 was discovered by Swedish astronomer Herman Schultz on November 11, 1867. The object was initially considered a "misty" object (a galaxy) based on the observations with research instruments of that time, and was included on the NGC list. Later it became clear that it was a double star.

== See also ==
- Double star
- List of NGC objects (1–1000)
- Pisces (constellation)
