= NGC 7769 =

Galaxy in the constellation Pegasus

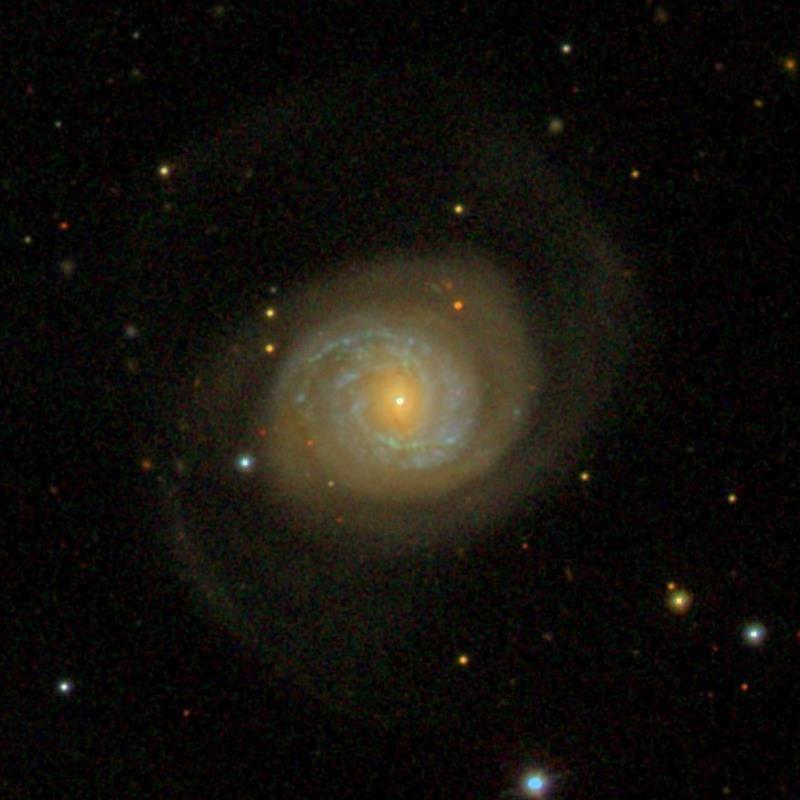
- NGC 7769 imaged by SDSS

Observation data (J2000 epoch)
- Constellation: Pegasus
- Right ascension: 23^{h} 51^{m} 03.9592^{s}
- Declination: +20° 09′ 01.508″
- Redshift: 0.014046
- Heliocentric radial velocity: 4211 ± 2 km/s
- Distance: 185.4 ± 13.0 Mly (56.85 ± 4.00 Mpc)
- Group or cluster: NGC 7771 Group (LGG 483)
- Apparent magnitude (V): 12.0

Characteristics
- Type: (R)SA(rs)b
- Size: ~176,600 ly (54.14 kpc) (estimated)
- Apparent size (V): 3.2′ × 2.7′

Other designations
- HOLM 820C, IRAS 23485+1952, 2MASX J23510396+2009014, UGC 12808, MCG +03-60-030, Mrk 9005, PGC 72615, CGCG 455-054

NGC 7769 is an unbarred spiral galaxy in the constellation of Pegasus. Its velocity with respect to the cosmic microwave background is 3855 ± 25 km/s, which corresponds to a Hubble distance of 56.85 ± 4 Mpc (~185 million light-years). It was discovered by German-British astronomer William Herschel on 18 September 1784.

The galaxies NGC 7769, together with NGC 7770 and NGC 7771, are listed together as Holm 820 in Erik Holmberg's A Study of Double and Multiple Galaxies Together with Inquiries into some General Metagalactic Problems, published in 1937. NGC 7769 also is listed as part of the five-member NGC 7771 Group (also known as LGG 483), which contains the 3 galaxies from Holm 820, NGC 7786, and UGC 12828.

NGC 7769 is a LINER galaxy, i.e. it has a type of nucleus that is defined by its spectral line emission which has weakly ionized or neutral atoms, while the spectral line emission from strongly ionized atoms is relatively weak.

== Supernovae ==
Three supernovae have been observed in NGC 7769:

- SN 2019iex (Type II, mag. 17.6) was discovered by the Searches After Gravitational-waves using ARizona Observatories (SAGUARO) project on 26 June 2019.
- SN 2022mxv (Type II, mag. 18.249) was discovered by ATLAS on 18 June 2022.
- SN 2022aedu (Type II, mag. 16.9) was discovered by Kōichi Itagaki on 31 December 2022.

== See also ==
- List of NGC objects (7001–7840)
