= NGC 279 =

Lenticular galaxy in the constellation Cetus

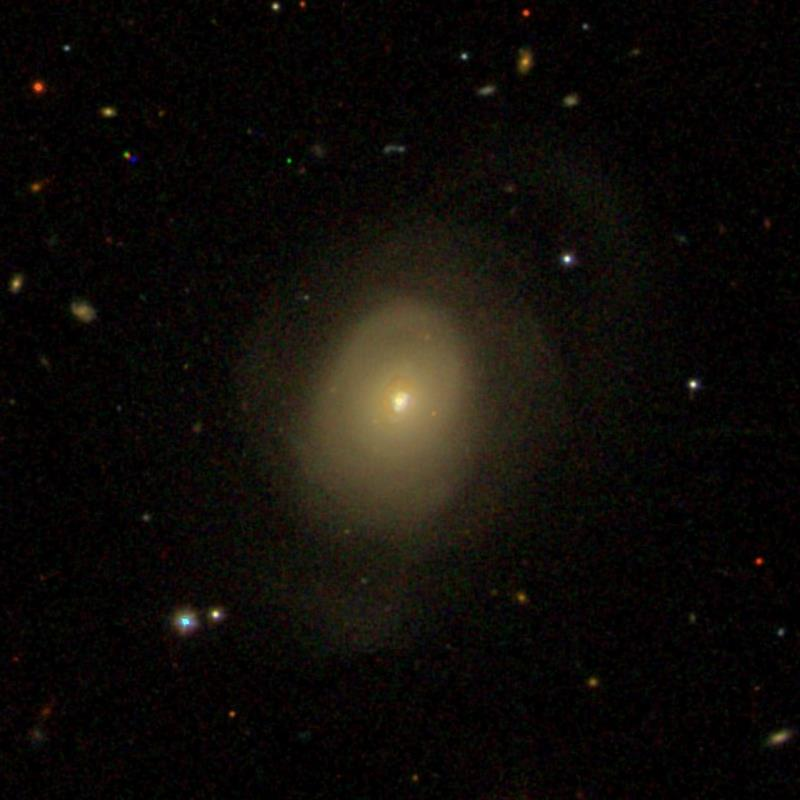
- SDSS image of NGC 279

Observation data (J2000 epoch)
- Constellation: Cetus
- Right ascension: 00^{h} 52^{m} 08.9^{s}
- Declination: −02° 13′ 06″
- Redshift: 0.012936
- Heliocentric radial velocity: 3,878 km/s
- Apparent magnitude (V): 13.66

Characteristics
- Type: S0
- Apparent size (V): 1.6' × 1.2'

Other designations
- UGC 00532, MRK 0558, CGCG 384-018, MCG +00-03-019a, 2MASX J00520893-0213064, 2MASXi J0052089-021304, IRAS 00495-0229, F00495-0229, PGC 3055, FIRST J005208.9-021306.

NGC 279 is a lenticular galaxy in the constellation Cetus. It was discovered on October 1, 1785 by William Herschel.

NGC 279 is part of a galaxy group known as LGG 13. Its members are NGC 259, NGC 271, NGC 245, NGC 307, Mk 557 and UGC 505.
