= NGC 302 =

Star in the constellation Cetus

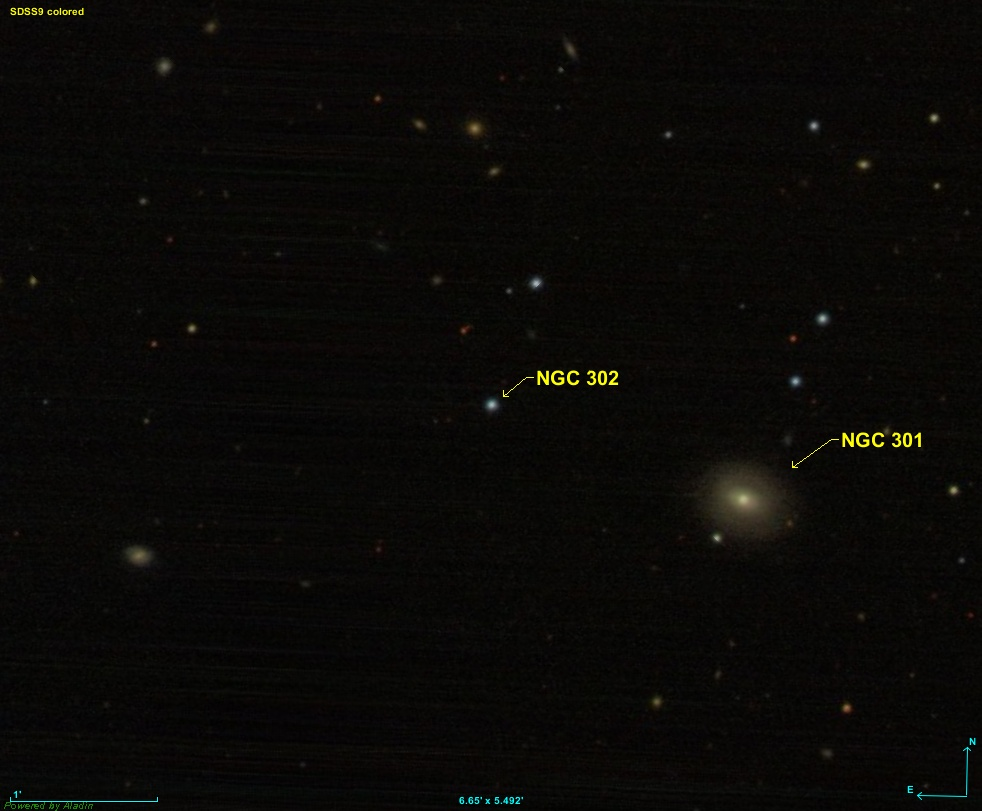
- NGC 302

Observation data Epoch J2000 Equinox ICRS
- Constellation: Cetus
- Right ascension: 00^{h} 56^{m} 25.3^{s}
- Declination: −10° 39′ 48″
- Apparent magnitude (V): 16.6g

Other designations
- SDSS J005625.30-103947.6

NGC 302 is a magnitude 16.6 star located in the constellation Cetus. It was recorded in 1886 by Frank Muller.

== See also ==
- List of NGC objects
- List of NGC objects (1-1000)
- Lists of stars
