= NGC 259 =

Galaxy located in the constellation Cetus

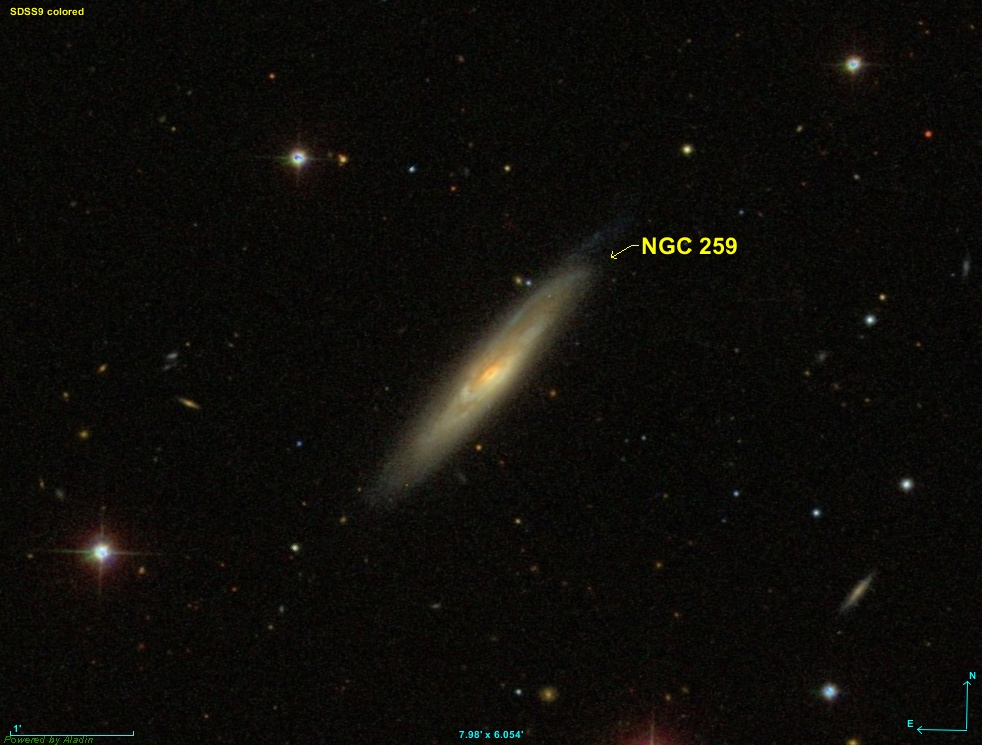
- SDSS image of NGC 259

Observation data (J2000 epoch)
- Constellation: Cetus
- Right ascension: 00^{h} 48^{m} 03.281^{s}
- Declination: −02° 46′ 31.01″
- Redshift: 0.013492
- Heliocentric radial velocity: 4045
- Distance: 153.84 ± 15.74 Mly (47.169 ± 4.827 Mpc)
- Apparent magnitude (B): 13.4

Characteristics
- Type: Sbc:
- Apparent size (V): 2.9′ × 0.6′

Other designations
- MCG-01-03-015, PGC 2820

NGC 259 is a spiral galaxy located in the constellation Cetus. It was discovered by William Herschel in 1786.

NGC 259 is part of a galaxy group known as LGG 13. It has at least 7 confirmed members, which are NGC 245, NGC 271, NGC 279, NGC 307, Mk 557 and UGC 505.

== Supernova ==
One supernova has been observed in NGC 259: SN 2017jbj (Type II, mag. 16.9) was discovered by Kōichi Itagaki on 20 December 2017.
