= NGC 245 =

Spiral galaxy located in the constellation Cetus

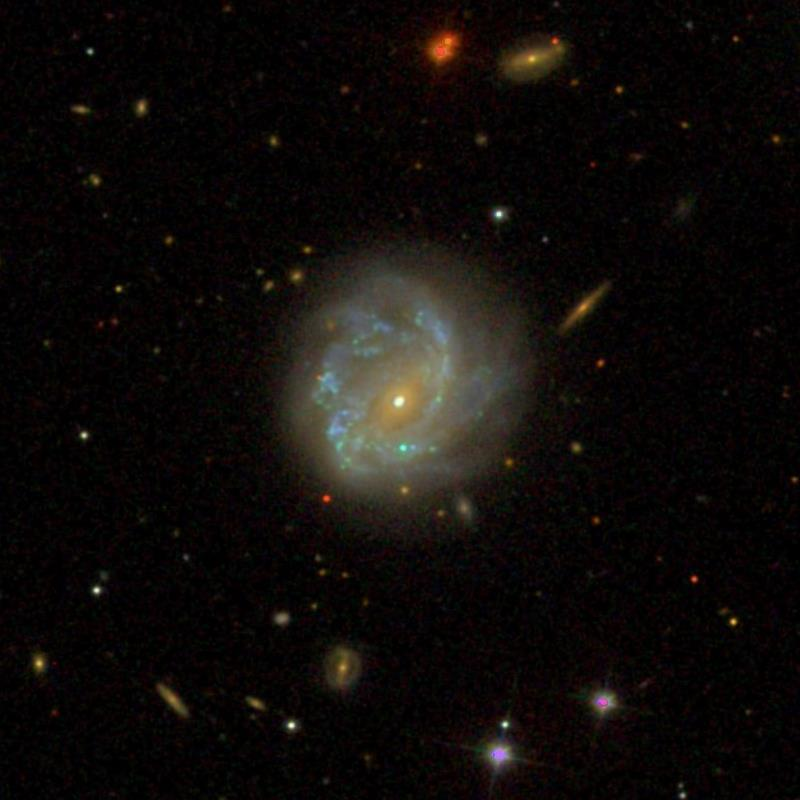
- SDSS image of NGC 245

Observation data (J2000 epoch)
- Constellation: Cetus
- Right ascension: 00^{h} 46^{m} 05.4^{s}
- Declination: −01° 43′ 24″
- Redshift: 0.013604
- Apparent magnitude (V): 12.97

Characteristics
- Type: Sb
- Apparent size (V): 1.4' × 1.2'

Other designations
- UGC 00476, MRK 0555, CGCG 384-004, MCG +00-03-005, 2MASX J00460539-0143242, 2MASXi J0046053-014324, IRAS 00435-0159, F00435-0159, 6dF J0046054-014324, PGC 2691.

NGC 245 is a spiral galaxy located in the constellation Cetus. It was discovered on October 1, 1785 by William Herschel.

It is part of a galaxy group known as LGG 13. It has at least 7 confirmed members which are NGC 259, NGC 271, NGC 279, NGC 307, Mk 557 and UGC 505.
