= NGC 308 =

Star in the constellation Cetus

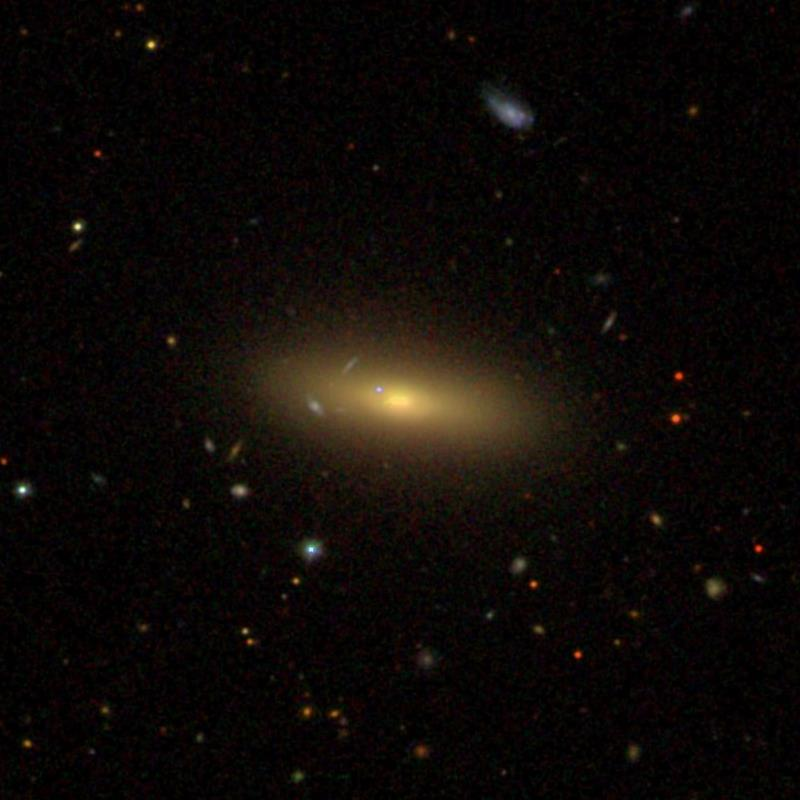
- NGC 308 is the brightest star below (south of) the lenticular galaxy NGC 307; Credit: SDSS

Observation data Epoch J2000.0 Equinox ICRS
- Constellation: Cetus
- Right ascension: 00^{h} 56^{m} 34.33^{s}
- Declination: −01° 47′ 03.6″
- Apparent magnitude (V): 15.7

Astrometry
Proper motion (μ)	RA: −5.284 mas/yr Dec.: −15.102 mas/yr
Parallax (π)	0.4388±0.0530 mas
Distance	approx. 7,400 ly (approx. 2,300 pc)

Details
Radius	1.56 R_{☉}
Luminosity	2.472 L_{☉}
Temperature	5,789 K

Other designations
- PGC 3354

Database references
SIMBAD	data

NGC 308 is a star located in the constellation Cetus. It is only 55" away from NGC 307. It was recorded on December 31, 1866, by Robert Ball.
