= NGC 271 =

Galaxy located in the constellation Cetus

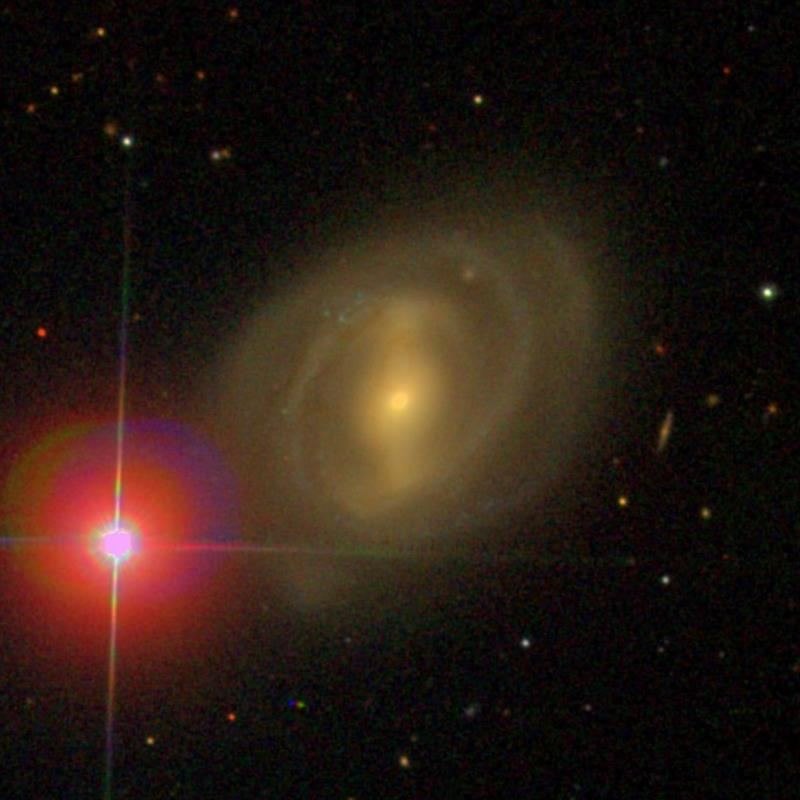
- SDSS image of NGC 271

Observation data (J2000 epoch)
- Constellation: Cetus
- Right ascension: 00^{h} 50^{m} 41.8^{s}
- Declination: −01° 54′ 37″
- Redshift: 0.013773
- Apparent magnitude (V): 12.91

Characteristics
- Type: SBab
- Apparent size (V): 2.1' × 1.7'

Other designations
- UGC 00519, CGCG 384-013, MCG +00-03-012, 2MASX J00504184-0154367, 2MASXi J0050418-015433, IRAS F00481-0211, 6dF J0050419-015437, PGC 2949.

NGC 271 is a barred spiral galaxy in the constellation Cetus. It was discovered on October 1, 1785 by William Herschel.

NGC 271 is part of a galaxy group known as LGG 13. It has at least 7 members, which are NGC 259, NGC 245, NGC 279, NGC 307, Mk 557 and UGC 505.
