= NGC 18 =

Double star system in the constellation of Pegasus

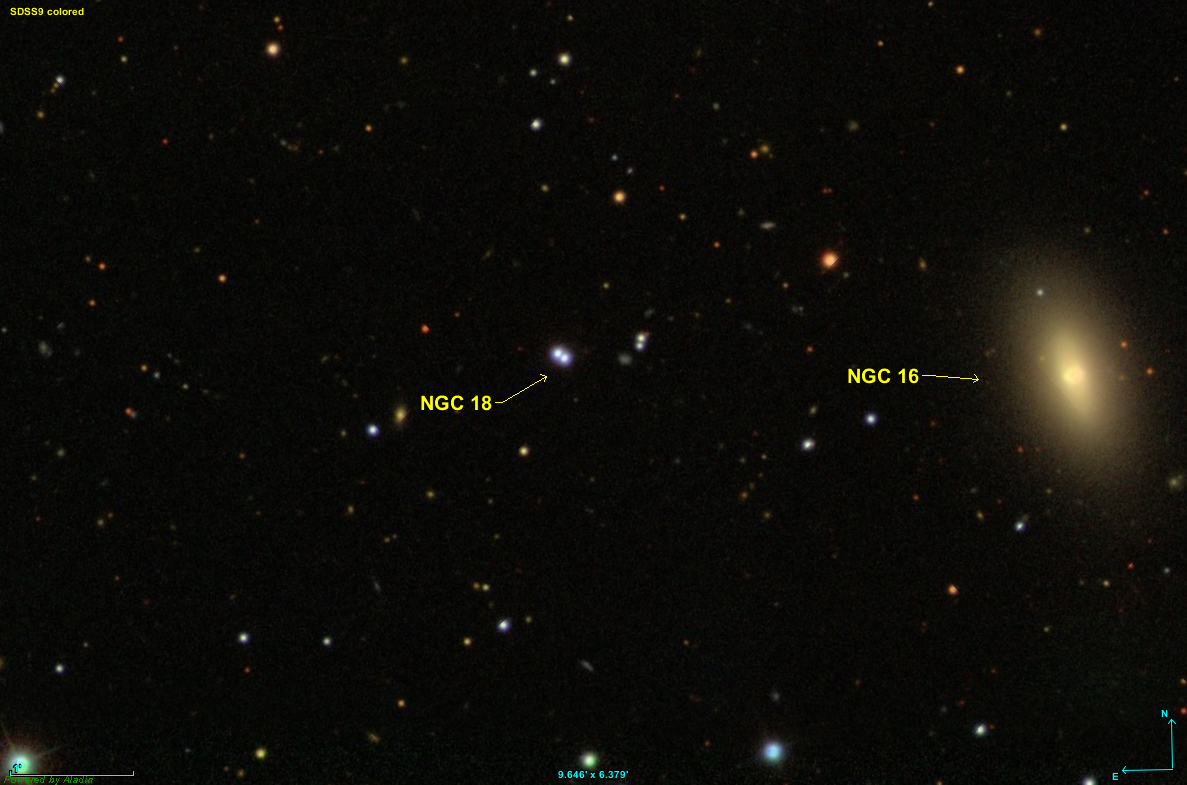

Observation data Epoch J2000 Equinox ICRS
- Constellation: Pegasus
- Right ascension: 00^{h} 09^{m} 23.1^{s}
- Declination: +27° 43′ 55″
- Apparent magnitude (V): 14

Other designations
- Pul-3 10207/10208

Database references
SIMBAD	Pul-3 10207

NGC 18 is a double star system located in the constellation of Pegasus. It was first recorded by Herman Schultz on 15 October 1866. It was looked for but not found by Édouard Stephan on 2 October 1882. It was independently observed by Guillaume Bigourdan in November 1886.

Both stars are 2528±20 light-years away, and based on this distance have a minimum separation of approximately 2,700 astronomical units, an unusually wide separation for a binary system.

== See also ==
- Double star
- Binary star
- List of NGC objects
- List of NGC objects (1–1000)
