= NGC 400 =

Star in the constellation of Pisces

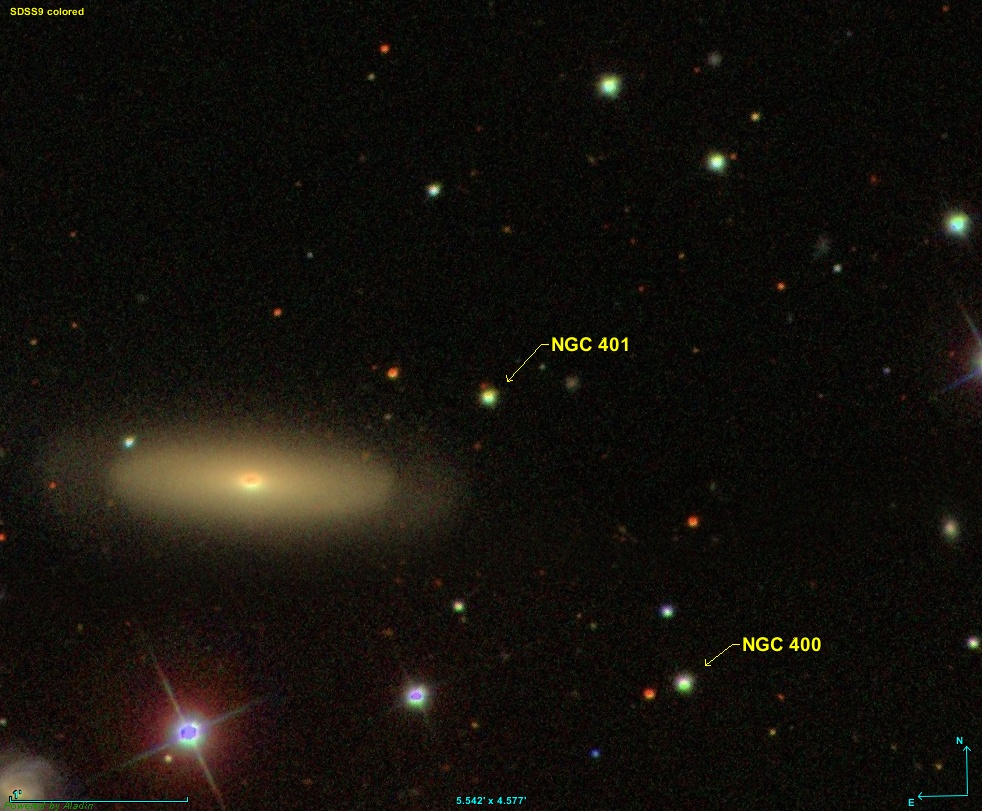

Observation data Epoch J2000 Equinox ICRS
- Constellation: Pisces
- Right ascension: 01^{h} 09^{m} 02.5^{s}
- Declination: +32° 43′ 57″
- Apparent magnitude (V): 15.3

Other designations
- GALEXMSC J010902.57+324400.1

NGC 400 is a star located in the constellation of Pisces. It was discovered on December 30, 1866, by Robert Ball.
