= NGC 370 =

Triple star in the constellation Pisces

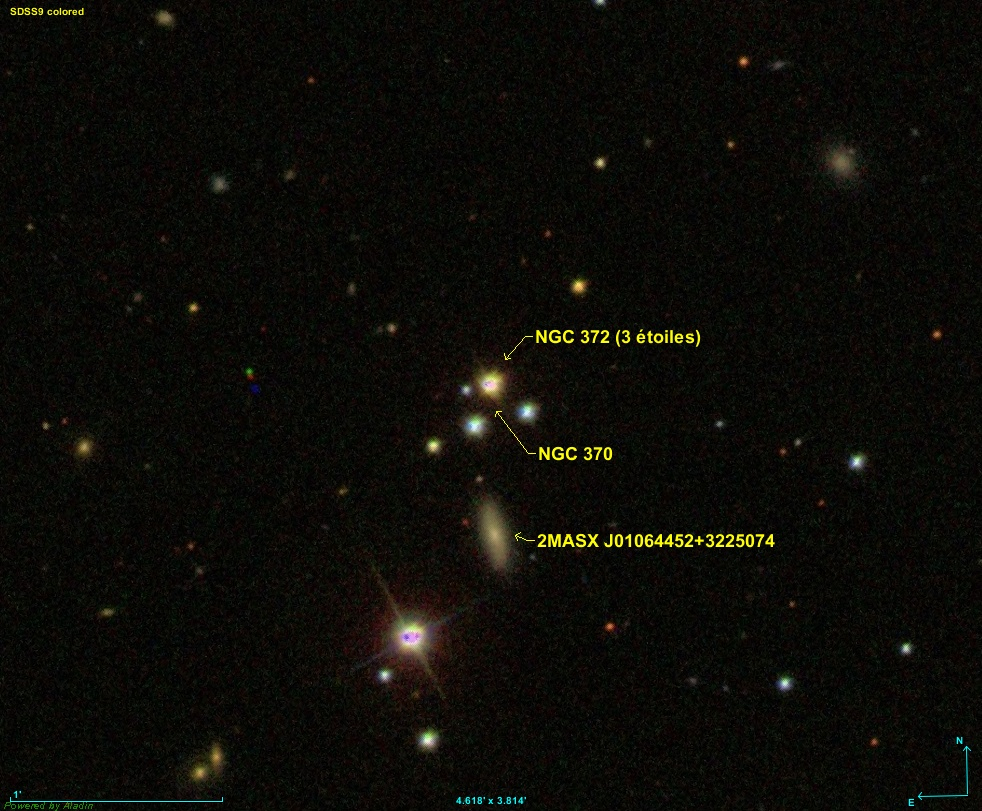

Observation data (J2000 epoch)
- Constellation: Pisces
- Right ascension: 01^{h} 06^{m} 44.6^{s}
- Declination: +32° 25′ 43″

Characteristics
- Type: Other

Other designations
- NGC 372.

NGC 370 is a triple star located in the constellation Pisces. It was recorded on October 7, 1861, by Heinrich d'Arrest. It was described by Dreyer as "very faint, 13th magnitude star 15 arcsec to south, diffuse." However, there is nothing there. It is now presumed to be either a lost or "non-existent" object, although it is possible it could be a duplication of NGC 372.
