= NGC 1276 =

Double star in the constellation Perseus

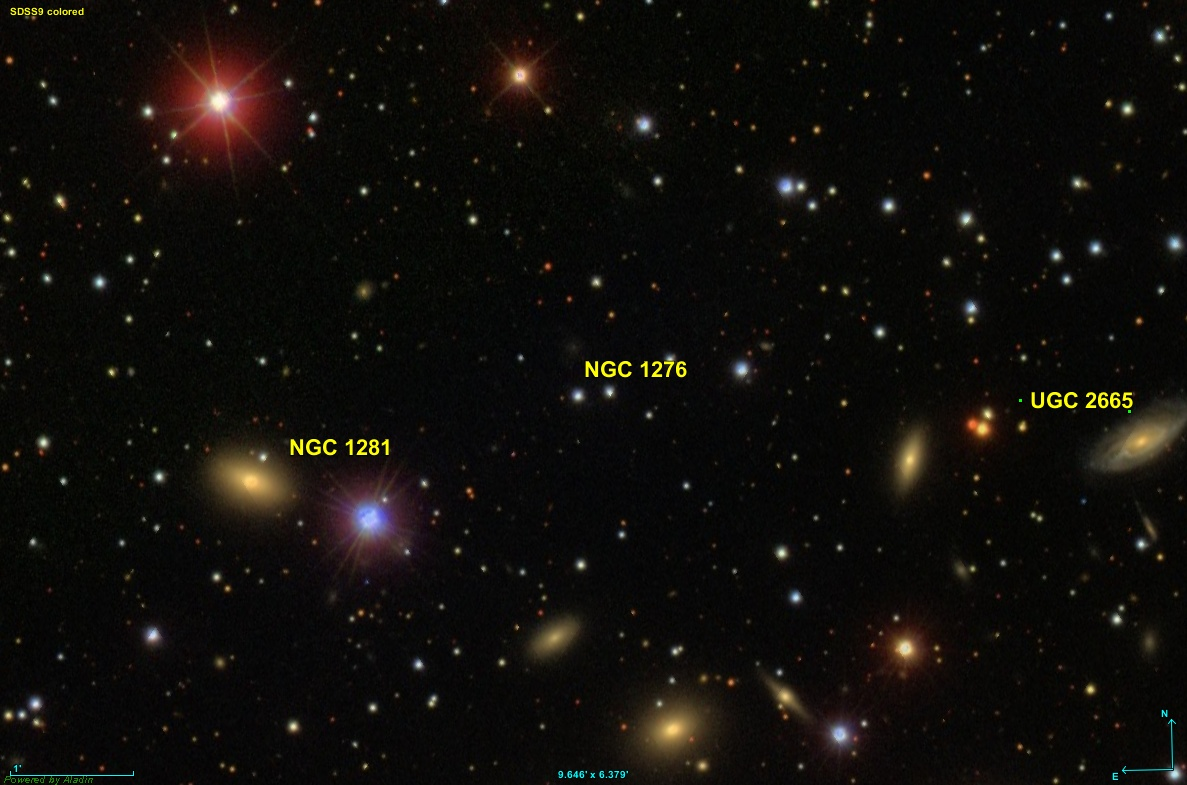
- Labeled SDSS image of NGC 1276. The galaxies NGC 1281, and UGC 2665 can be seen nearby.

Observation data Epoch J2000.0 Equinox ICRS
- Constellation: Perseus
- NGC 1276
- Right ascension: 03^{h} 19^{m} 51.2^{s}
- Declination: +41° 38′ 29″
- Pul -3 270349
- Right ascension: 03^{h} 19^{m} 50.54216^{s}
- Declination: +41° 38′ 31.3678″
- Pul -3 270357
- Right ascension: 03^{h} 19^{m} 51.89745^{s}
- Declination: +41° 38′ 29.3640″

Characteristics
- Apparent magnitude (B): 15.6 (Pul -3 270349)/15.5 (Pul -3 270357)
- Apparent magnitude (R): 14.8 (Pul -3 270349)/14.7 (Pul -3 270357)

Astrometry

Pul -3 270349
Proper motion (μ)	RA: +0.576 mas/yr Dec.: −3.787 mas/yr
Parallax (π)	0.8814±0.0323 mas
Distance	1,134 parsecs (3,700 ly) ly

Pul -3 270357
Proper motion (μ)	RA: +2.389 mas/yr Dec.: −4.469 mas/yr
Parallax (π)	0.5635±0.0338 mas
Distance	1,774 parsecs (5,790 ly) ly

Details

Pul -3 270349
Radius	1.09 R_{☉}
Luminosity	0.838 L_{☉}
Temperature	5299.00 K

Pul -3 270357
Radius	1.48 R_{☉}
Luminosity	1.964 L_{☉}
Temperature	5614.53 K

Other designations
- Pul -3 270349: WISEA J031950.54+413831.4, 2MASS J03195054+4138313, GALEXASC J031950.58+413831.6, GALEXMSC J031950.52+413831.0, SSTSL2 J031950.52+413831.3, TIC 178110482, Gaia DR2 239424674200835712
- Pul -3 270357: WISEA J031951.89+413829.3, 2MASS J03195190+4138293, GALEXASC J031951.93+413829.8, GALEXMSC J031951.88+413829.5, SSTSL2 J031951.88+413829.3, TIC 178110483, Gaia DR2 239424669903392256

Database references
SIMBAD	Pul -3 270349
- Pul -3 270357

NGC 1276 is an optical double star system located in the constellation Perseus. The system was discovered by astronomer John Dreyer on December 12, 1876. The pair consists of two 15th magnitude stars known as Pul -3 270349 and Pul -3 270357 that are unrelated as they lie at different distances from each other. Pul -3 270349 lies at a distance of 1,134.5587 parsecs (3,700.436 ly) and Pul -3 270357 lies at a distance of 1,774.6229 parsecs (5,788.046 ly).

The two stars are about the same size and luminosity as the Sun.

== See also ==
- List of NGC objects (1001–2000)
- Double star
