= NGC 313 =

Triple star in the constellation Pisces

Observation data Epoch J2000 Equinox ICRS
- Constellation: Pisces
- Right ascension: 00^{h} 57^{m} 45.6^{s}
- Declination: +30° 21′ 58″

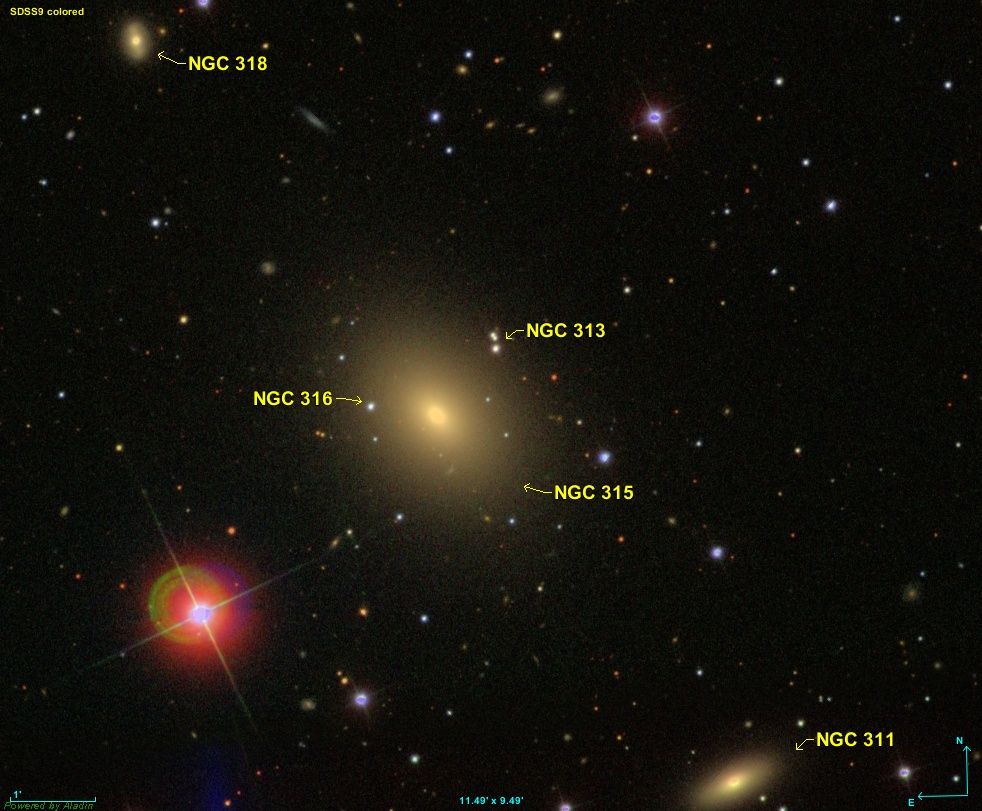
NGC 313

NGC 313 is a triple star located in the constellation Pisces. It was discovered on November 29, 1850, by Bindon Stoney.
