= NGC 316 =

Star in the constellation Pisces

Observation data Epoch J2000 Equinox ICRS
- Constellation: Pisces
- Right ascension: 00^{h} 57^{m} 52.4^{s}
- Declination: +30° 21′ 55″

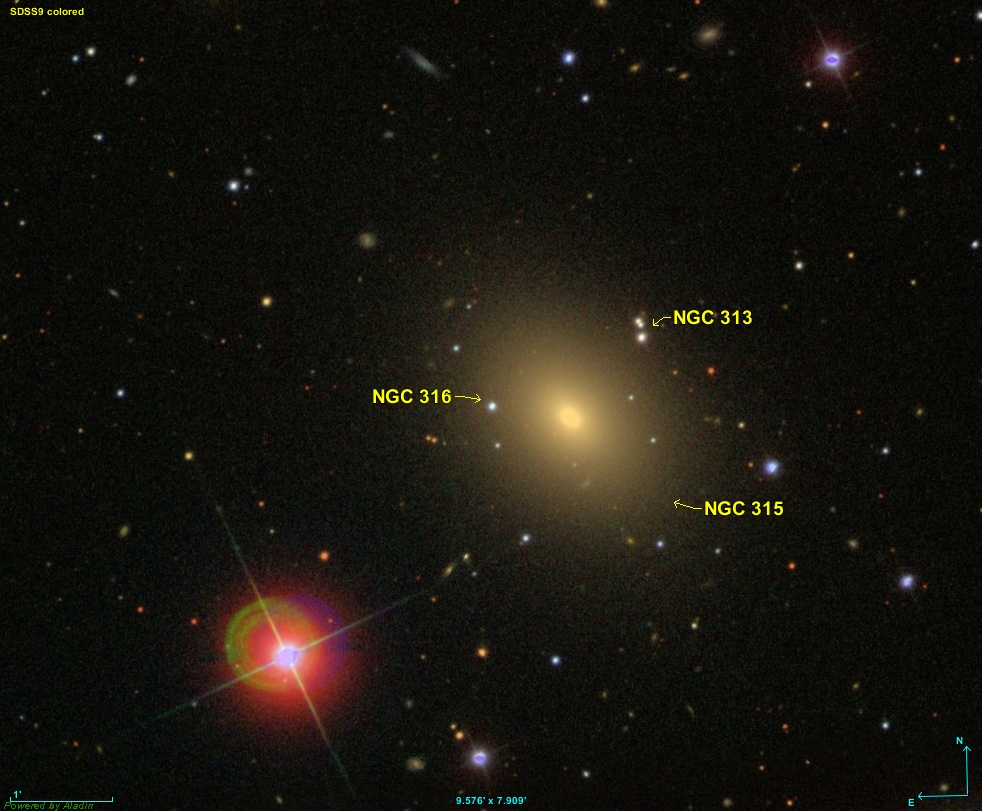
NGC 316

NGC 316 is a star located in the constellation Pisces. It was discovered on November 29, 1850 by Bindon Stoney.
