= NGC 464 =

Star in the constellation Andromeda

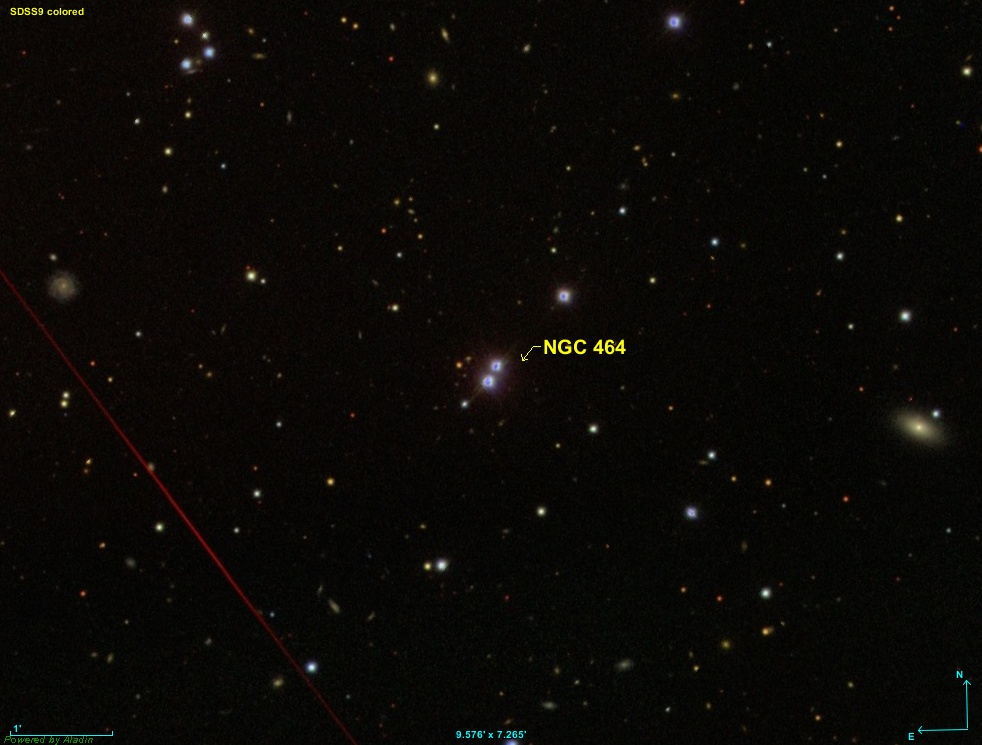
- SDSS image of NGC 464

Observation data Epoch J2000 Equinox ICRS
- Constellation: Andromeda
- Right ascension: 01^{h} 19^{m} 26.68^{s}
- Declination: +34° 57′ 19.5″

NGC 464 is a double star located in the constellation Andromeda. It was discovered in 1882 by Wilhelm Tempel.
