= NGC 401 =

Star in the constellation Pisces

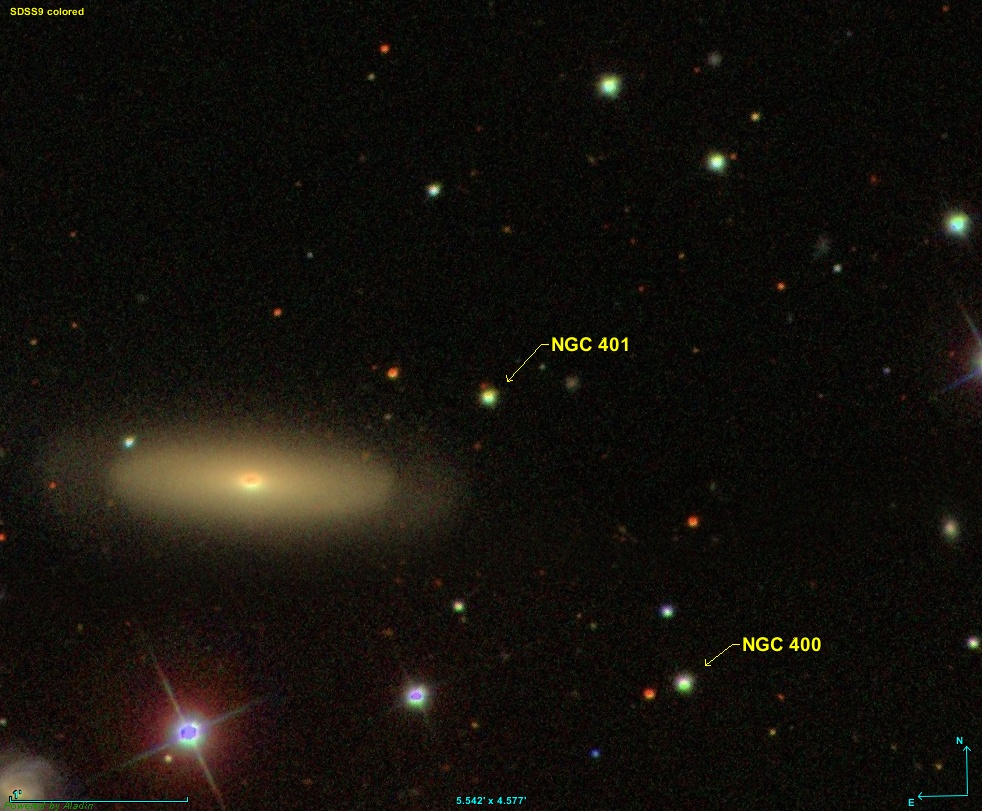
- NGC 401

Observation data Epoch J2000 Equinox ICRS
- Constellation: Pisces
- Right ascension: 01^{h} 09^{m} 07.7^{s}
- Declination: +32° 45′ 34″
- Apparent magnitude (V): 15.4

NGC 401 is a star located in the constellation of Pisces. It was discovered on December 30, 1866, by Robert Ball.
