= NGC 310 =

Star in the constellation Cetus

Observation data Epoch J2000.0 Equinox ICRS
- Constellation: Cetus
- Right ascension: 00^{h} 56^{m} 48.0^{s}
- Declination: −01° 45′ 57″
- Apparent magnitude (V): 14.6

Other designations
- PGC 3396

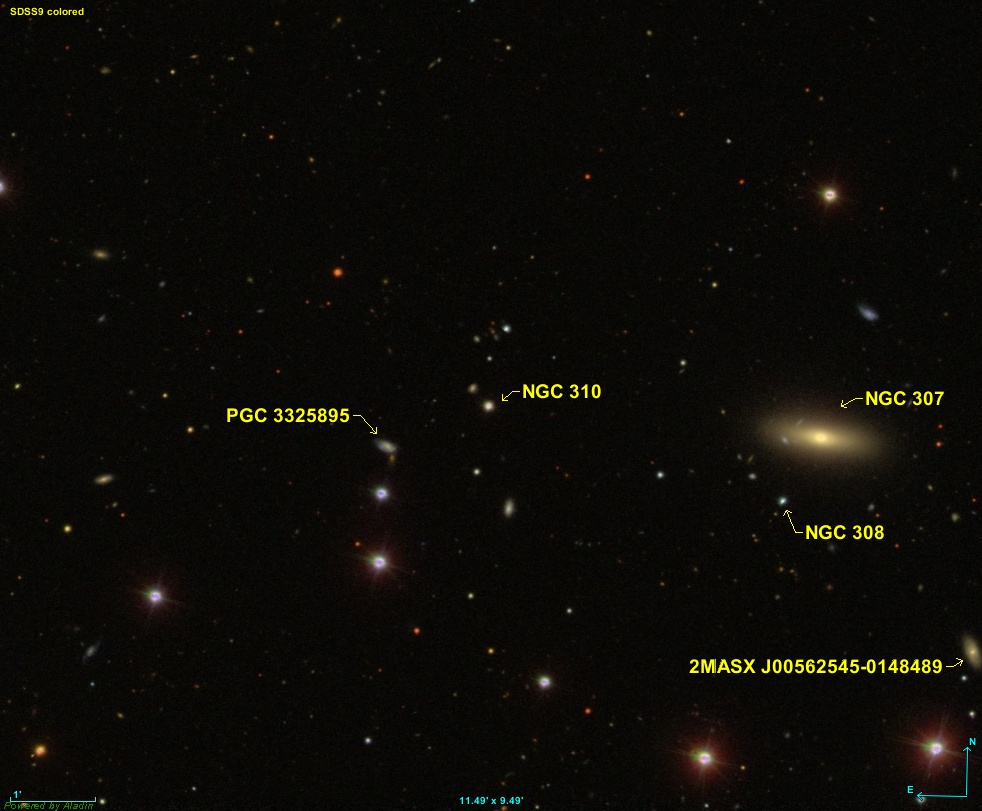
NGC 310

NGC 310 is a star located in the constellation Cetus. It was recorded on December 31, 1866, by Robert Ball.
