= HD 6869 =

Star in the constellation of Phoenix

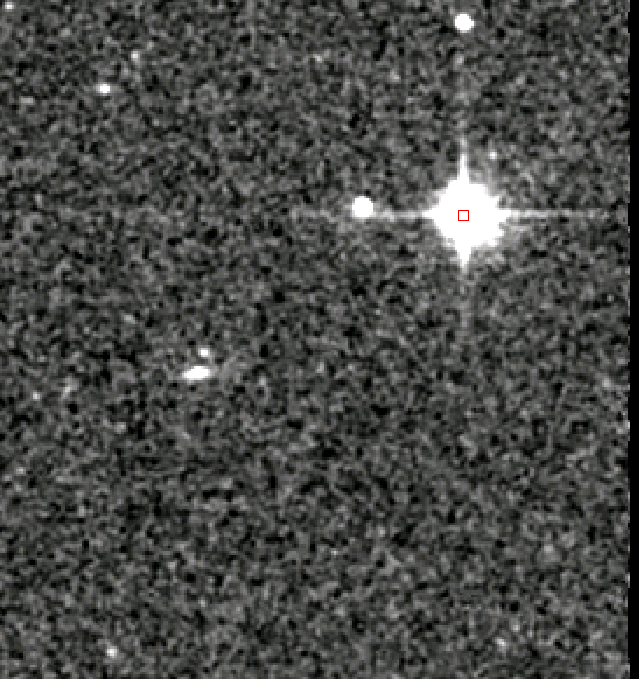
- 2MASS view of HD 6869

Observation data Epoch J2000 Equinox ICRS
- Constellation: Phoenix
- Right ascension: 01^{h} 08^{m} 34.1^{s}
- Declination: −46° 40′ 07″
- Apparent magnitude (V): 7.1

Characteristics
- Spectral type: F0V

Astrometry
Radial velocity (R_{v})	13.7 km/s

Other designations
- HD 6869, ESO 243-*39, 1WGA J0108.5-4639, 1RXS J010835.3-464025

Database references
SIMBAD	data

HD 6869 is a 7th magnitude star located in the constellation of Phoenix. It was discovered on September 6, 1834 by John Herschel and later led to the entry NGC 405 in the New General Catalogue.
