= NGC 82 =

Star in the constellation Andromeda

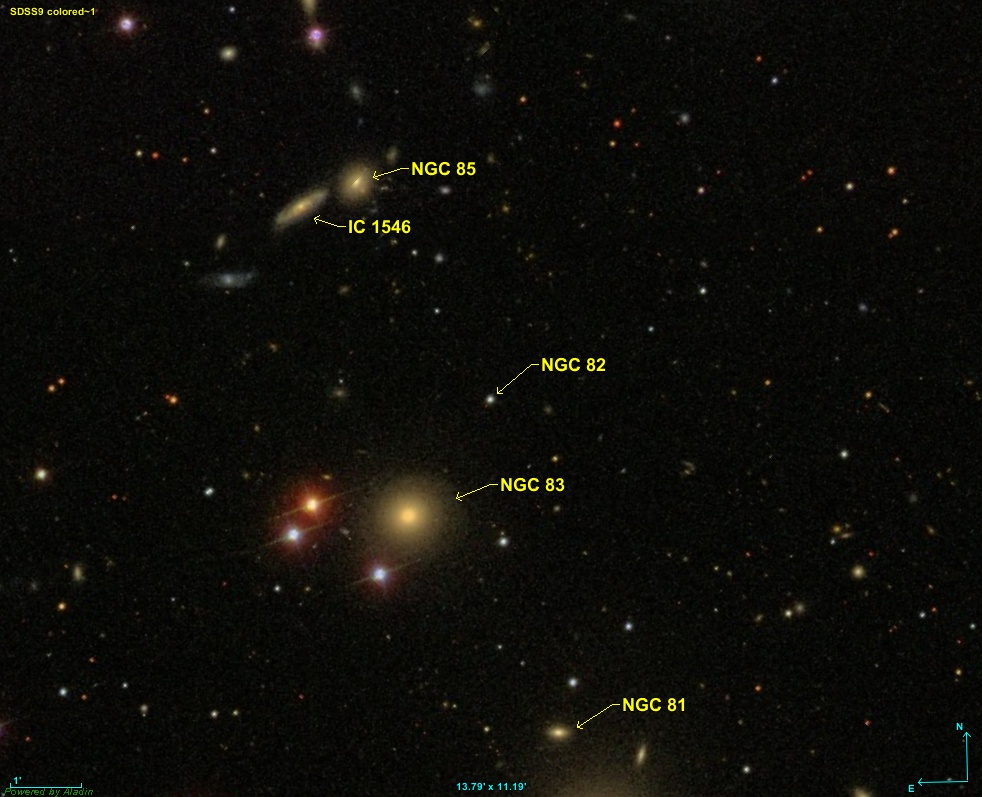
- NGC 82

Observation data Epoch J2000 Equinox ICRS
- Constellation: Andromeda
- Right ascension: 00^{h} 21^{m} 17.5^{s}
- Declination: +22° 27′ 37″
- Apparent magnitude (V): 14.7448 ± 0.0002

Characteristics

Astrometry
Radial velocity (R_{v})	-26.78 ± 6.44 km/s
Proper motion (μ)	RA: -8.1824 ± 0.0313 mas/yr Dec.: -7.6520 ± 0.0281 mas/yr
Parallax (π)	1.3643±0.0284 mas
Distance	2,390 ± 50 ly (730 ± 20 pc)

Other designations
- Gaia DR3 2800747456462816768 2MASS 00211748+2227383 WISEA J002117.48+222738.1

NGC 82 is a magnitude 14.8 star located in the constellation Andromeda. It was first recorded by French astronomer Guillaume Bigourdan on October 23, 1884.
