= NGC 390 =

Star in the constellation Pisces

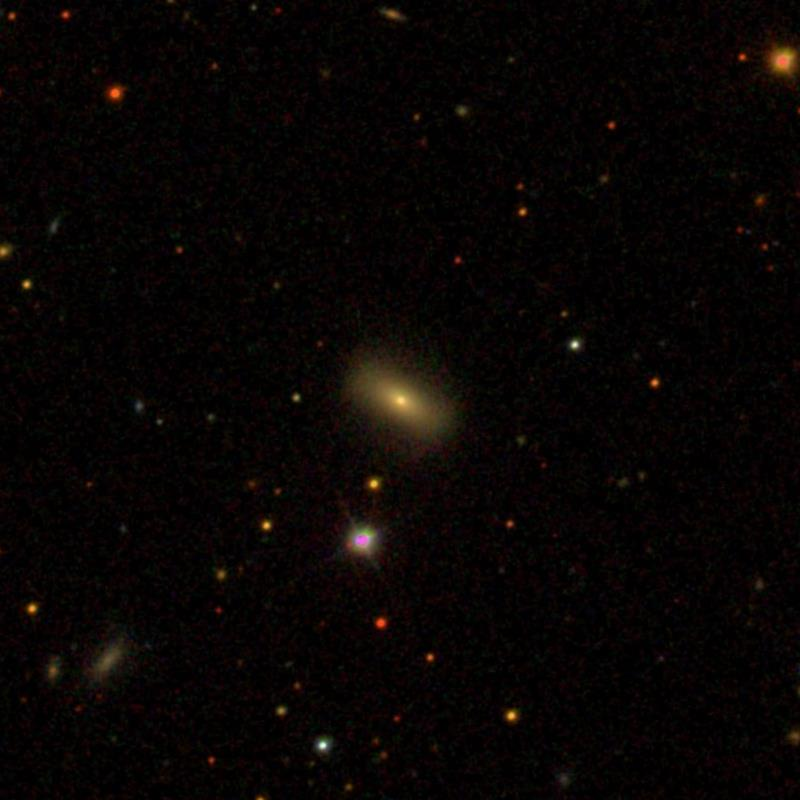
- SDSS image of NGC 390

Observation data (J2000 epoch)
- Constellation: Pisces
- Right ascension: 01^{h} 07^{m} 53.7^{s}
- Declination: +32° 25′ 59″
- Apparent magnitude (V): 14.9

Characteristics
- Type: *

Other designations
- PGC 3325902

NGC 390 is a star located in the constellation Pisces. It was discovered on November 19, 1884 by Guillaume Bigourdan. It was described by Dreyer as very faint, very small, stellar." However, this position precesses to a position where there is nothing apart from a few scattered stars. Bigourdan's original measurements point exactly to a star, which is the most likely candidate for NGC 390; however, as a result of this confusion, a galaxy nearby (PGC 4021) has sometimes been mistaken as NGC 390.
