= NGC 372 =

Star system in the constellation Pisces

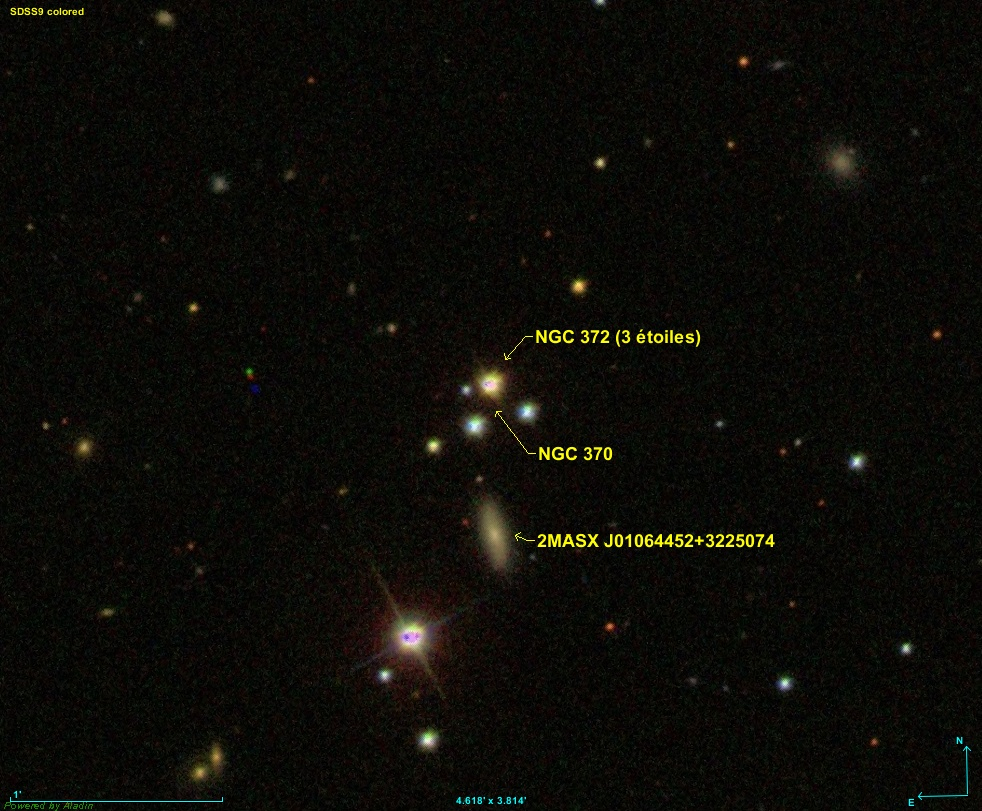
- SDSS view of NGC 372

Observation data (J2000 epoch)
- Constellation: Pisces
- Right ascension: 01^{h} 06^{m} 44.6^{s}
- Declination: +32° 25′ 43″

Characteristics
- Type: Other

Other designations
- NGC 370.

NGC 372 is a triple star located in the constellation Pisces. It was discovered on December 12, 1876, by Dreyer, who described it as "stellar, much brighter middle, mottled but not resolved."
