= NGC 307 =

Galaxy located in the constellation Cetus

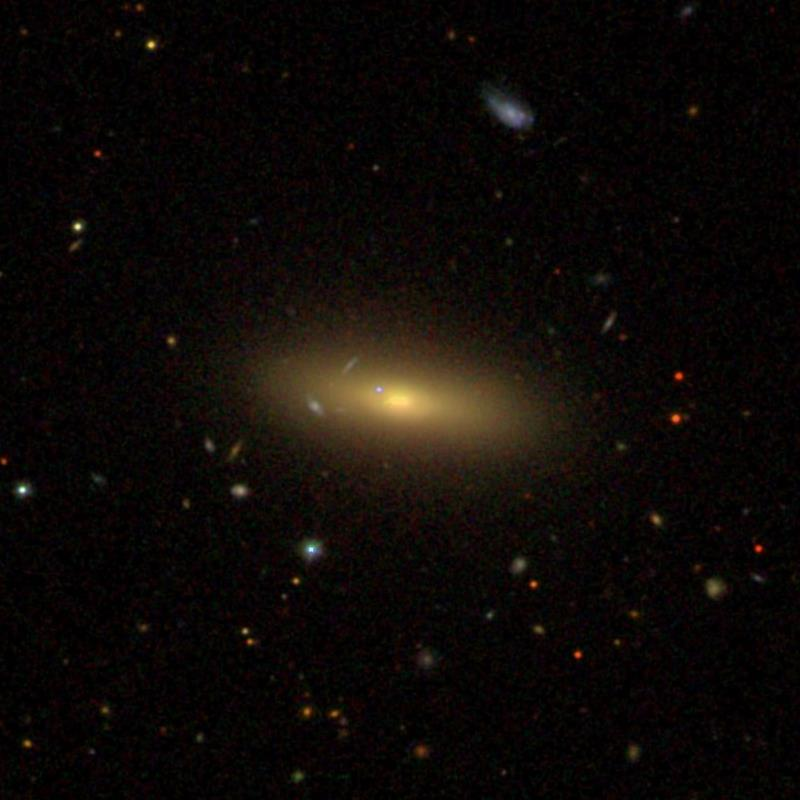
- SDSS image of NGC 307

Observation data (J2000 epoch)
- Constellation: Cetus
- Right ascension: 00^{h} 56^{m} 32.6^{s}
- Declination: −01° 46′ 19″
- Redshift: 0.013376
- Heliocentric radial velocity: 4,010 km/s
- Apparent magnitude (V): 13.75

Characteristics
- Type: S0
- Apparent size (V): 1.6' × 0.7'

Other designations
- UGC 00584, CGCG 384-039, MCG +00-03-035, 2MASX J00563259-0146189, 2MASXi J0056328-014617, 6dF J0056325-014619, PGC 3367.

NGC 307 is a lenticular galaxy in the constellation Cetus. It was discovered on September 6, 1831 by John Herschel.

NGC 307 is considered to be part of a galaxy group known as LGG 13. It has 7 members, which are NGC 259, NGC 271, NGC 279, NGC 245, Mk 557 and UGC 505.

== Supernova ==
One supernova has been observed in NGC 307: SN 2008ee (Type Ia, mag. 15.5) was discovered by the Lick Observatory Supernova Search (LOSS) on 16 July 2008.
