= NGC 730 =

Star in the constellation Pisces

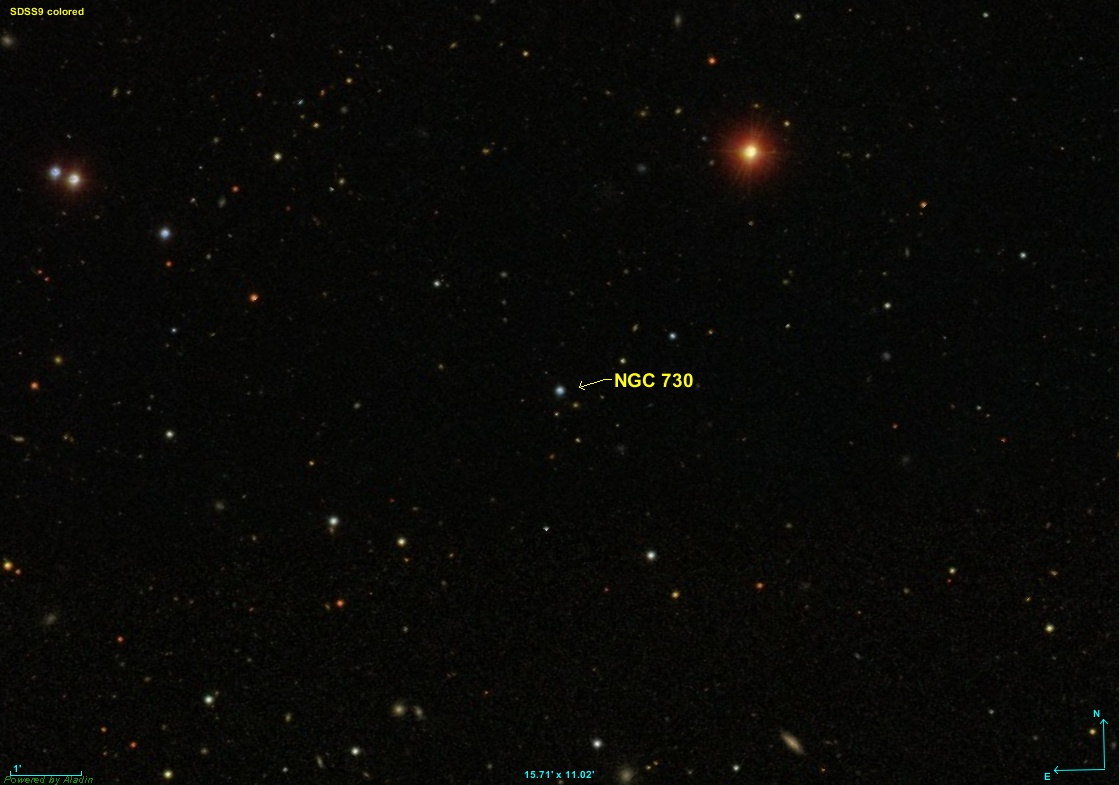
- DSS Image of NGC 730

Observation data Epoch J2000.0 Equinox ICRS
- Constellation: Pisces
- Right ascension: 01^{h} 55^{m} 17^{s}
- Declination: +05° 38′ 10″

NGC 730 is a star located in the constellation Pisces discovered on 7 November 1885, appearing around the celestial equator being partially visible to both hemispheres during specific times of the year.

== See also ==
- List of NGC objects (1–1000)
