= NGC 402 =

Star in the constellation Pisces

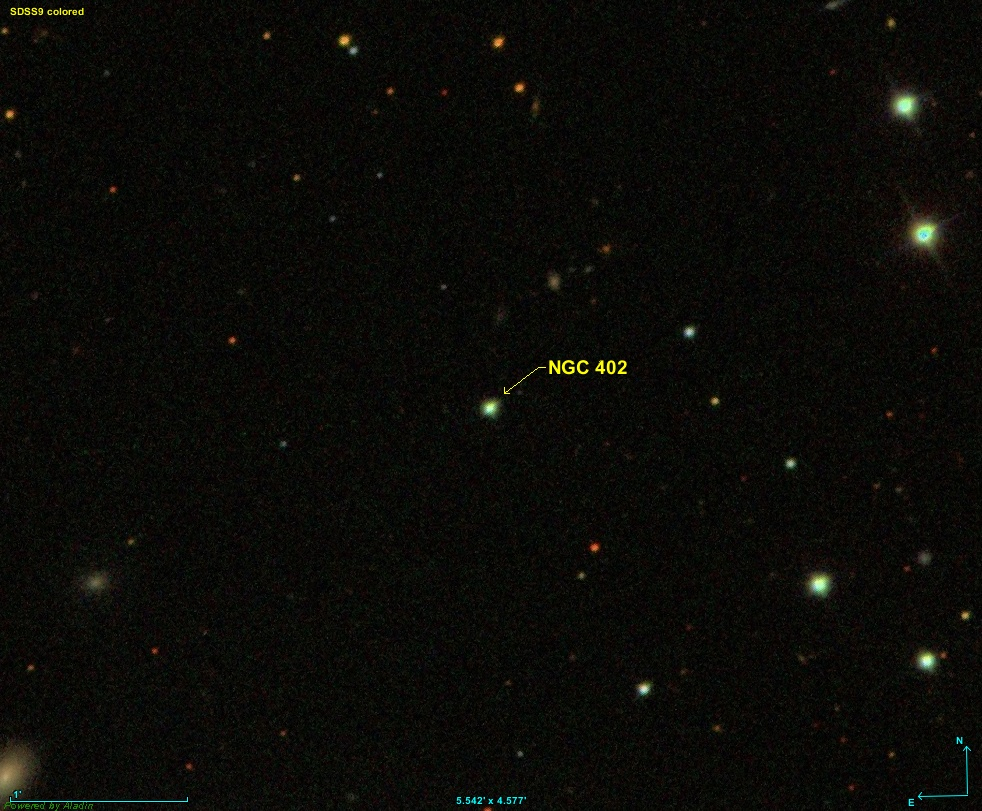
- Image by the Sloan Digital Sky Survey

Observation data Epoch J2000 Equinox ICRS
- Constellation: Pisces
- Right ascension: 01^{h} 09^{m} 13.3^{s}
- Declination: +32° 48′ 22″
- Apparent magnitude (V): 15.5

NGC 402 is a star located in the constellation of Pisces. It was discovered on October 7, 1874, by Lawrence Parsons.
