= Herman Schultz (astronomer) =

Swedish astronomer (1823–1890)

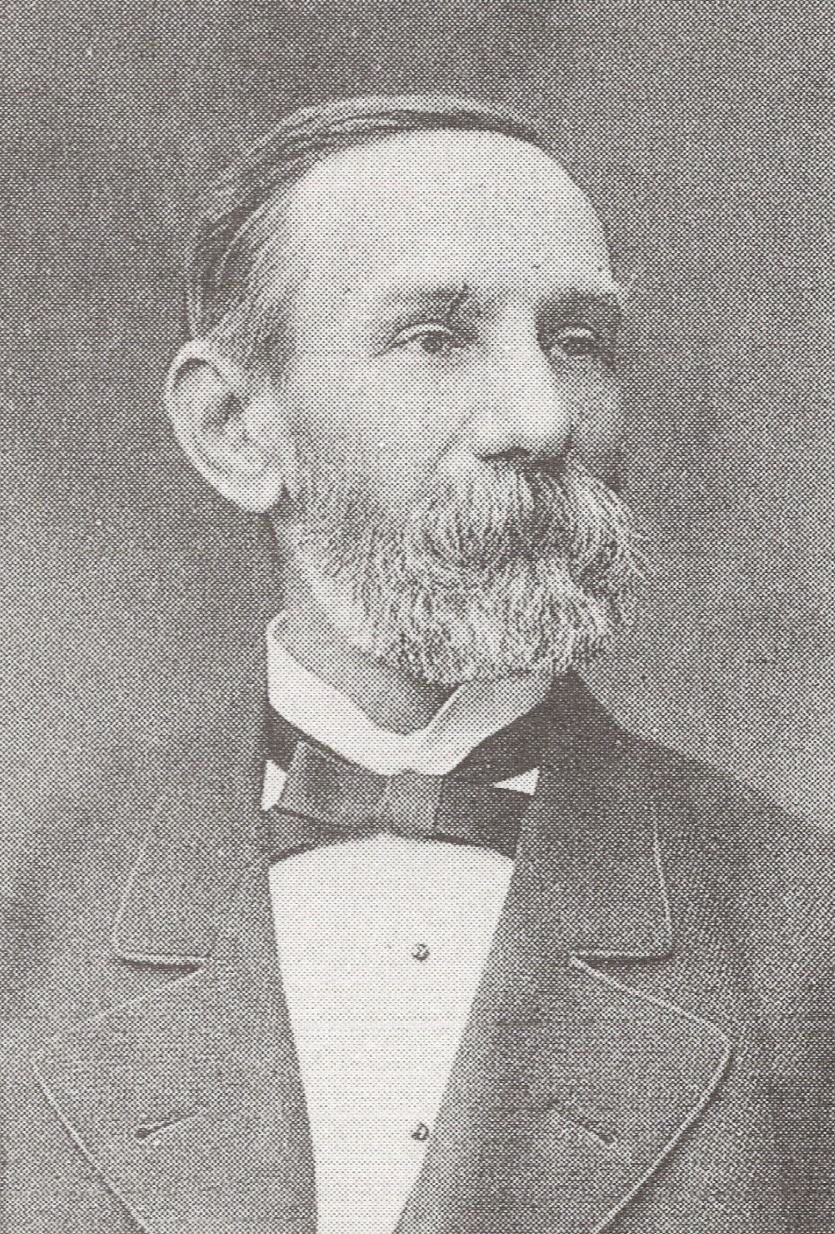
Per Magnus Herman Schultz

Per Magnus Herman Schultz (7 July 1823, in Södermanland – 8 May 1890, in Stockholm) was a Swedish astronomer.

== Biography and career ==
In 1878, Schultz became a professor at Uppsala University and director of the Uppsala Astronomical Observatory. In 1873 he became a member of the Royal Society of Sciences in Uppsala and joined the Royal Swedish Academy of Sciences in 1875.

In 1860, he married Charlotte Klara Amlie Steinheil, daughter of astronomer Carl August von Steinheil. Over the course of his career, Schultz discovered 13 objects that were later listed in the New General Catalogue by John Louis Emil Dreyer. NGC 18 is an example.
