= List of NGC objects =

The following is a list of NGC objects, that is objects listed in the New General Catalogue (NGC). It is one of the largest comprehensive astronomical catalogues for deep sky objects such as star clusters, nebulae, and galaxies.

- List of NGC objects (1–1000)
- List of NGC objects (1001–2000)
- List of NGC objects (2001–3000)
- List of NGC objects (3001–4000)
- List of NGC objects (4001–5000)
- List of NGC objects (5001–6000)
- List of NGC objects (6001–7000)
- List of NGC objects (7001–7840)

== Stars ==
Some objects originally thought to be deep sky objects and listed in the NGC have been subsequently shown to be ordinary stars, so their inclusion in the catalog is now considered erroneous. This list of stars is based on the "NGC 2000.0" version of the catalog, which lists the stars in its errata, supplemented with data on each individual star from the VizieR database.

== See also ==
- Lists of astronomical objects
