= NGC 4 =

Galaxy in the constellation Pisces

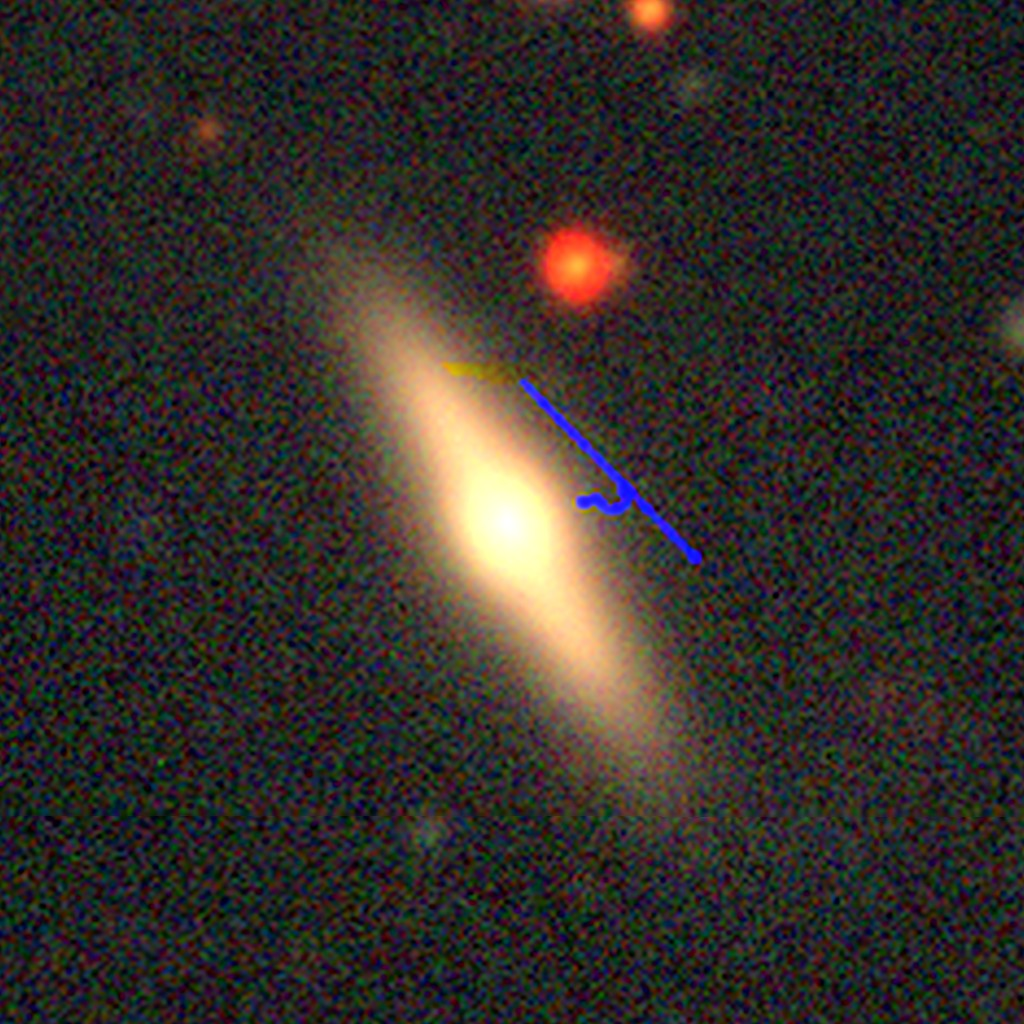
- NGC 4 by the DESI Legacy Surveys

Observation data (J2000 epoch)
- Constellation: Pisces
- Right ascension: 00^{h} 07^{m} 24.4^{s}
- Declination: +08° 22′ 26″
- Apparent magnitude (V): 15.9

Characteristics
- Type: S0-a
- Size: ~107,600 ly (33.00 kpc) (estimated)

Other designations
- GC 5080, LEDA 212468.

NGC 4 is a lenticular galaxy with the morphological type of S0-a, located in the constellation of Pisces. NGC 4 was discovered by Albert Marth on 29 November 1864 using a 48-inch reflecting telescope.

== Observational History ==
NGC 4 was first observed by Albert Marth on 29 November 1864 on the same night NGC 3 was discovered. NGC 4 was described as "extremely faint". NGC 4 is about 4.7 arcminutes northeast of NGC 3 and about 2.9 arcminutes west of a G-type star BD+07 1.

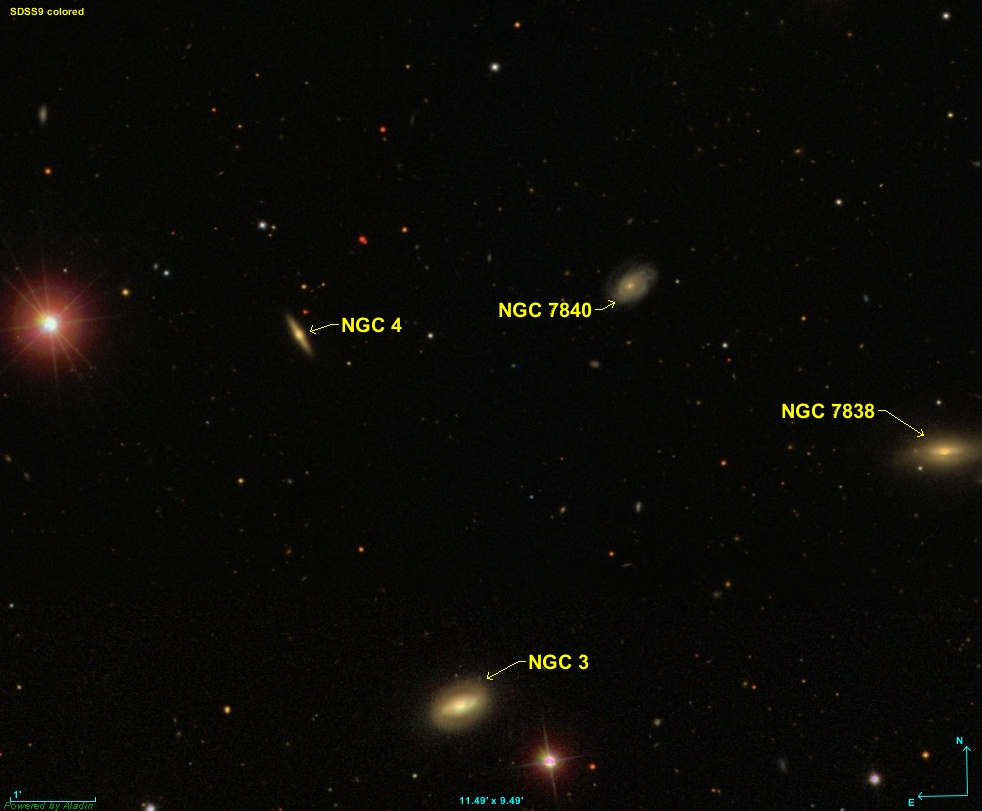
SDSS image showing NGC 4 and its surrounding

=== PGC 620 ===
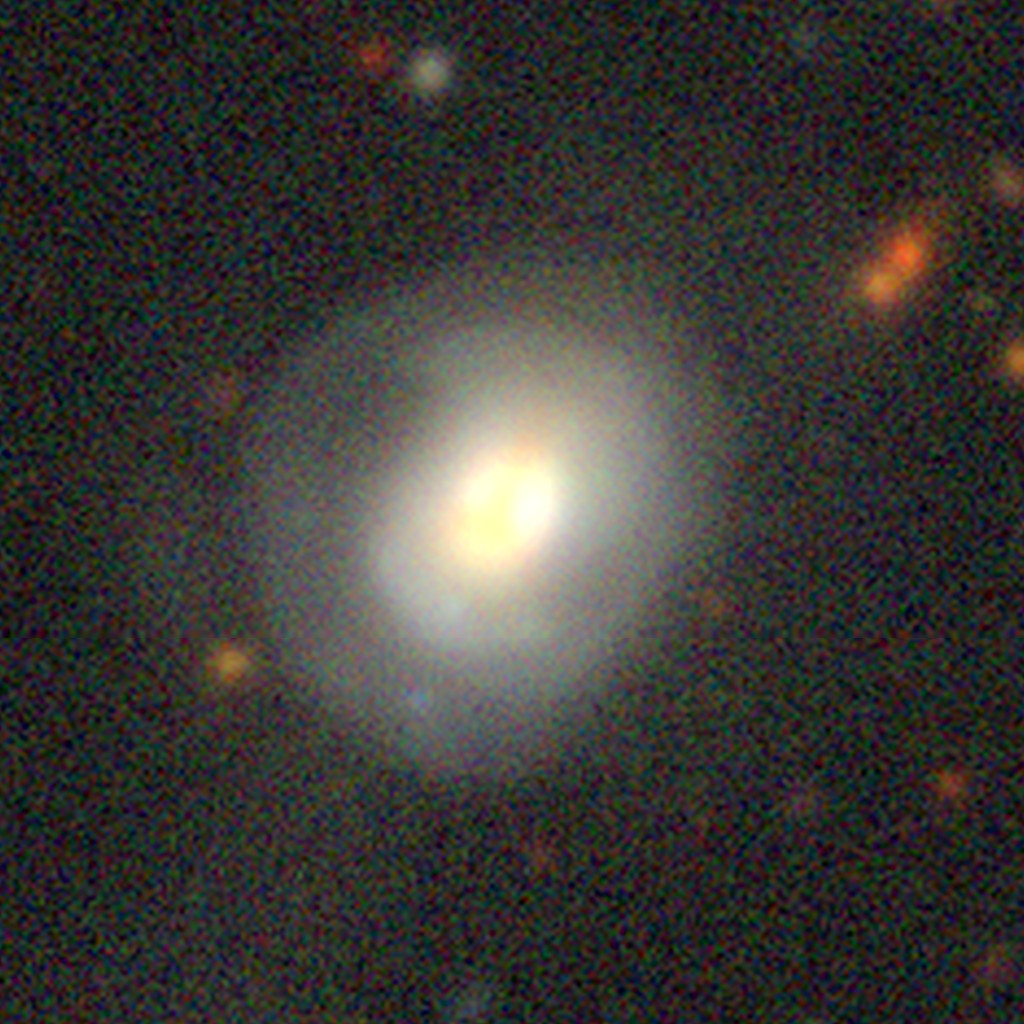
PGC 620 by the DESI Legacy Surveys

PGC 620 was a galaxy in the Lyon-Meudon Extragalactic Database which designated PGC 620 as NGC 4 because the catalogers didn't realize that Marth could see an object as faint as NGC 4. Marth was using a telescope with a 48-inch aperture, and could see a 16th-magnitude galaxy.

The error in the LEDA database has been corrected and the galaxy was designated as PGC 212468 for NGC 4, with its incorrect identification as PGC 620 noted immediately below as a warning.

== Properties ==
NGC 4 is a lenticular galaxy with an approximated distance of 406 million light years and an approximated size of 59,000 light years across, both of these having a high degree of uncertainty

== Gallery ==
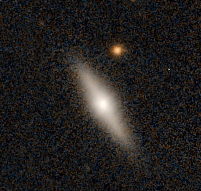
NGC 4 by PanSTARRS1

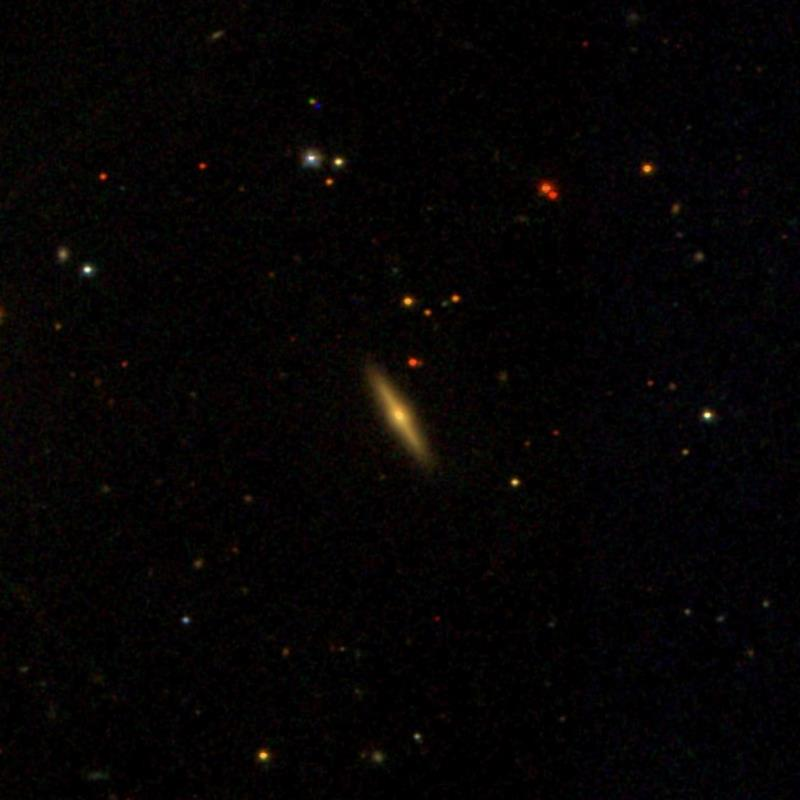
SDSS image of NGC 4

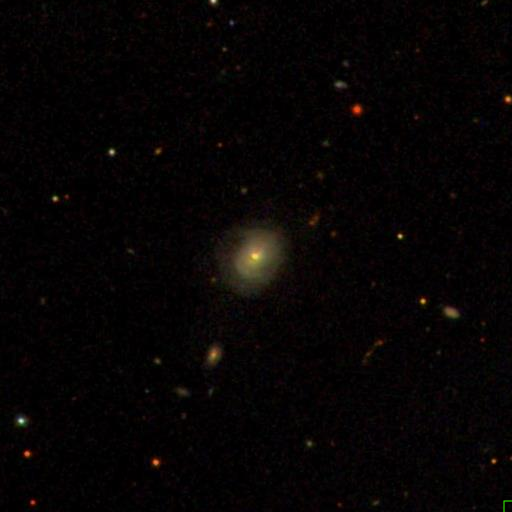
SDSS image of PGC 6240
