= NGC 7056 =

Galaxy in the constellation Pegasus

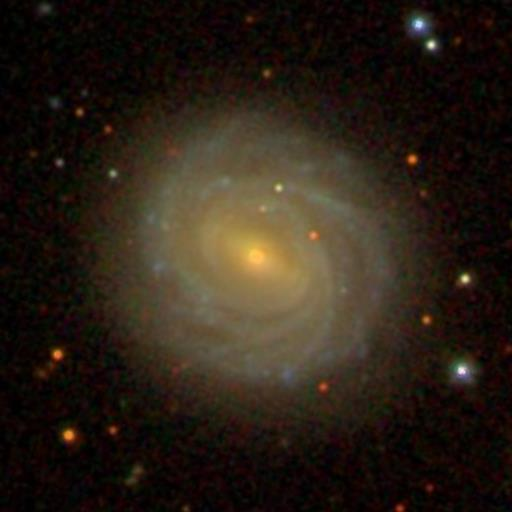
- SDSS image of NGC 7056.

Observation data (J2000 epoch)
- Constellation: Pegasus
- Right ascension: 21^{h} 22^{m} 07.5^{s}
- Declination: 18° 39′ 56″
- Redshift: 0.017932
- Heliocentric radial velocity: 5,376 km/s
- Distance: 225 Mly
- Apparent magnitude (V): 13.75

Characteristics
- Type: SBb
- Apparent size (V): 1.0 x 0.9

Other designations
- IC 1382, CGCG 449-19, KARA 911, MCG 3-54-8, PGC 66641, UGC 11734

NGC 7056 is a barred spiral galaxy located about 225 million light-years away in the constellation of Pegasus. NGC 7056 was discovered by astronomer Albert Marth on September 17, 1863. It was then rediscovered by astronomer Truman Henry Safford on September 29, 1866.

== See also ==
- NGC 7051
