= NGC 349 =

Galaxy in the constellation Cetus

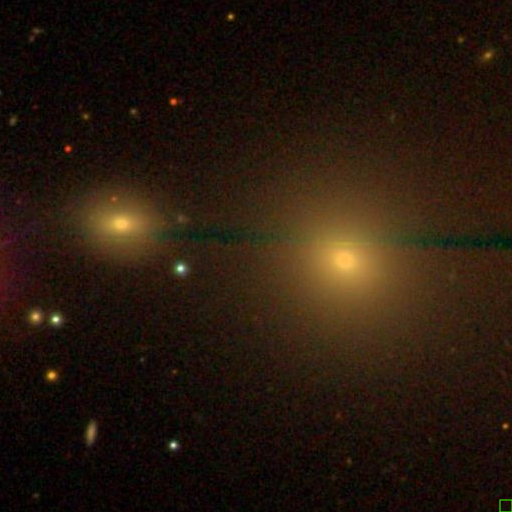
- SDSS image of NGC 349 (right) and NGC 350 (left)

Observation data (J2000 epoch)
- Constellation: Cetus
- Right ascension: 01^{h} 01^{m} 50.7^{s}
- Declination: −06° 47′ 59″
- Redshift: 0.019967
- Heliocentric radial velocity: 5,986 km/s
- Apparent magnitude (V): 14.19

Characteristics
- Type: S0
- Apparent size (V): 1.3' × 0.9'

Other designations
- MCG -01-03-068, 2MASX J01015074-0647594, PGC 3687, PMN J0101-0648.

NGC 349 is a lenticular galaxy in the constellation Cetus. It was discovered on September 27, 1864, by Albert Marth. It was described by John Louis Emil Dreyer as "very faint, very small".

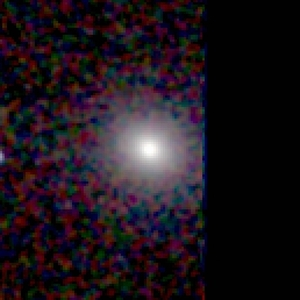
NGC 349 (2MASS)
