= NGC 997 =

Interacting Galaxy in the constellation Cetus

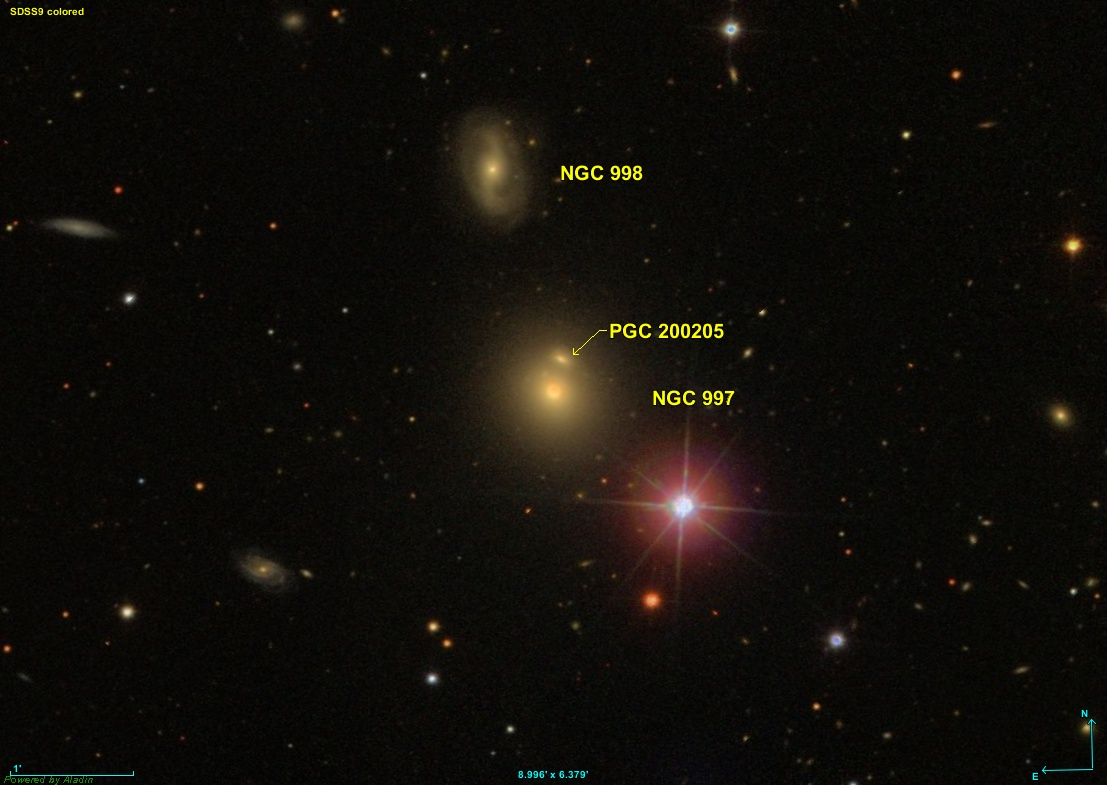
- NGC 997 and its neighbouring galaxies captured by SDSS

Observation data (J2000 epoch)
- Constellation: Cetus
- Right ascension: 02^{h} 37^{m} 14.50^{s}
- Declination: ±07° 18′ 28.0″
- Redshift: 0.021695
- Heliocentric radial velocity: 6504 ± 42 km/s
- Distance: 301.6 ± 21.3 Mly (92.48 ± 6.54 Mpc)
- Group or cluster: [CHM2007] HDC 157, [CHM2007] LDC 181, [T2015] nest 200334

Characteristics
- Type: E
- Size: ~105,800 ly (32.44 kpc) (estimated)

Other designations
- IRAS F02345+0705, UGC 2102, MCG +01-07-016, CGCG 414-027

NGC 997 is an interacting galaxy in the constellation of Cetus. The galaxy was discovered by Albert Marth on 10 November 1863. It has a regularly rotating central molecular gas disk, containing a black hole of between 4 × 10^{7} and 1.8 × 10^{9} solar masses. Its speed relative to the cosmological background is 6,270 ± 45 km/s, corresponding to a Hubble distance of 92.5 ± 6.5 Mpc (~302 million ly).

NGC 997 is accompanied by PGC 200205, also designated as NGC 997 NED01, a compact galaxy. No data is available for the latter galaxy. So, this pair may be due to an optical alignment, or they may be two gravitationally interacting galaxies about to merge.

One supernova has been observed in NGC 997: SN 2020nej (type Ia, mag. 17).

== See also ==
- List of NGC objects
- List of NGC objects (1-1000)
