= NGC 139 =

Spiral galaxy in the constellation Pisces

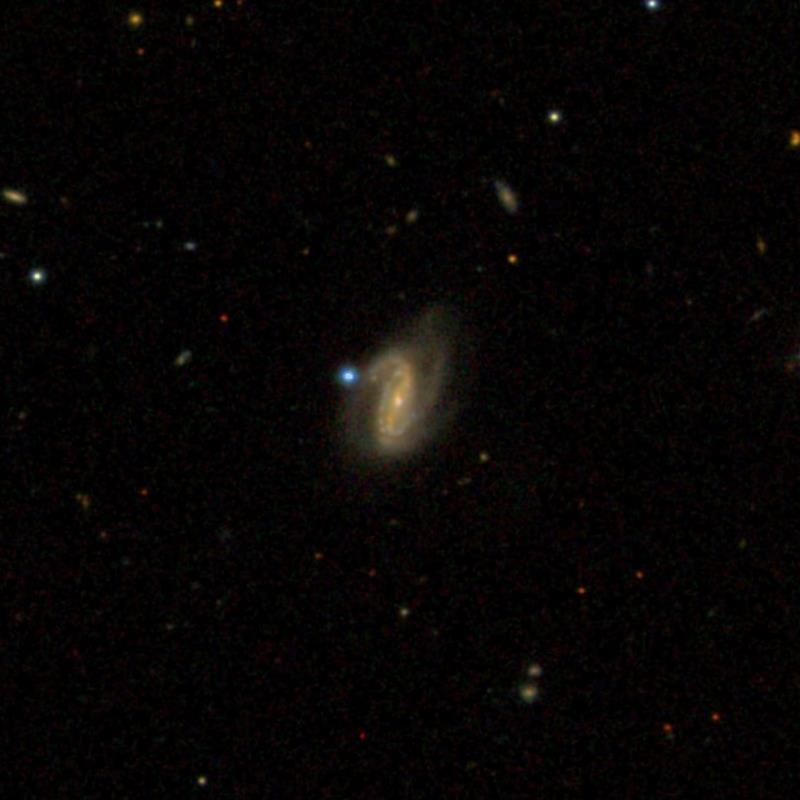
- SDSS image of NGC 2998

Observation data (J2000.0 epoch)
- Constellation: Pisces
- Right ascension: 00^{h} 31^{m} 06.4^{s}
- Declination: ±05° 04′ 44″
- Redshift: 0.040671
- Heliocentric radial velocity: 12193
- Galactocentric velocity: 12300

Characteristics
- Type: SB

Other designations
- IRAS F00285+0448

NGC 139 is a barred spiral galaxy in the constellation Pisces. It was discovered on August 29, 1864, by the German astronomer Albert Marth.
