= NGC 117 =

Lenticular galaxy in the constellation Cetus

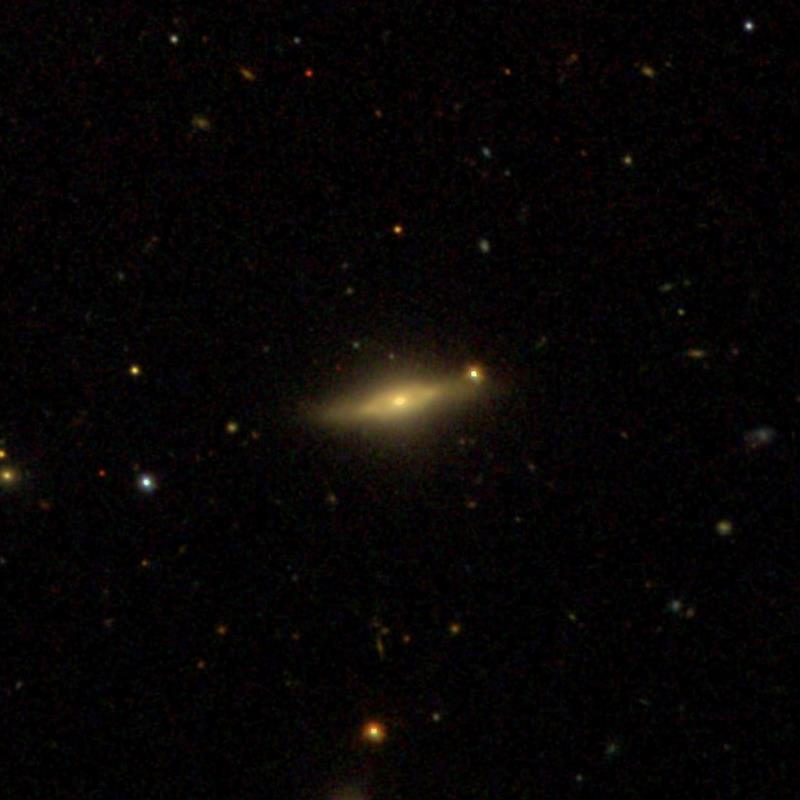
- SDSS image of NGC 117

Observation data (J2000 epoch)
- Constellation: Cetus
- Right ascension: 00^{h} 27^{m} 11.14^{s}
- Declination: +01° 20′ 00.5″
- Redshift: 0.017972
- Heliocentric radial velocity: 5339 ± 35 km/s
- Distance: 234.9 Mly (72.02 Mpc)
- Apparent magnitude (B): 15.41

Characteristics
- Type: S0^{+}:

Other designations
- MCG +00-02-029, PGC 1674

NGC 117 is a lenticular galaxy with a magnitude of 14.3 in the constellation Cetus. NGC 117 is its New General Catalogue designation. It was discovered on September 13, 1863, by the astronomer Albert Marth.

== See also ==
- List of NGC objects
