= NGC 208 =

Spiral galaxy in the constellation Pisces

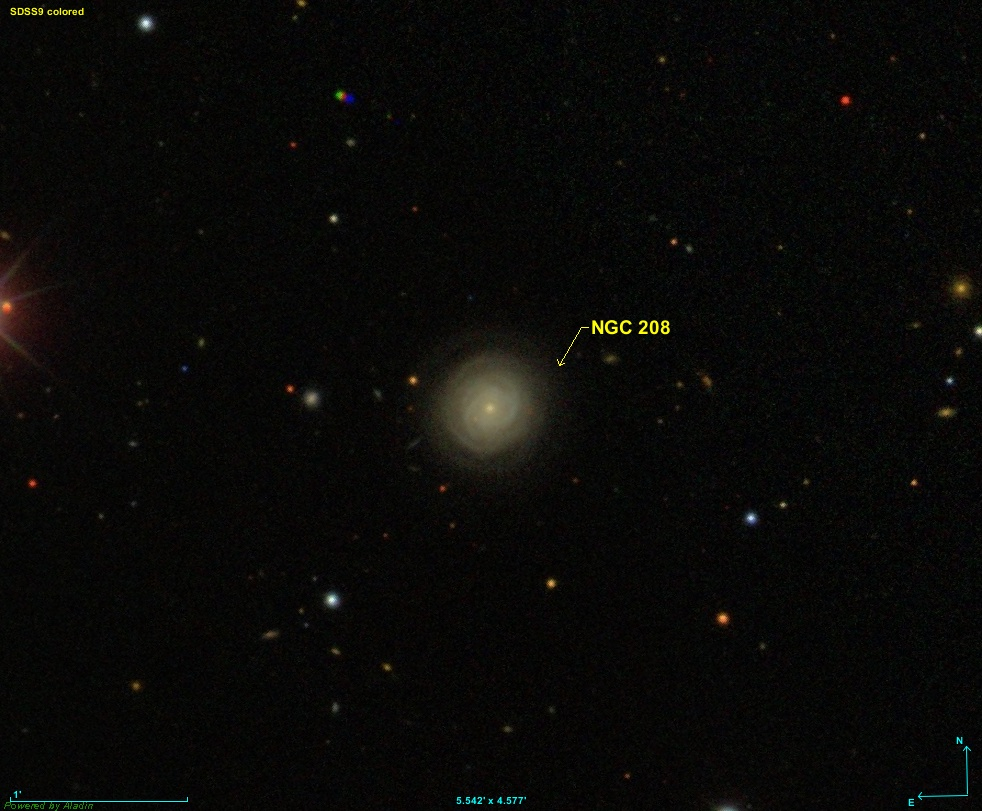

Observation data (J2000 epoch)
- Constellation: Pisces
- Right ascension: 00^{h} 40^{m} 17.6^{s}
- Declination: +02° 45′ 23″
- Redshift: 0.017072
- Distance: 229 Mly
- Apparent magnitude (V): 15.17

Characteristics
- Type: Sa
- Apparent size (V): 0.7' × 0.7'

Other designations
- CGCG 383-064, MCG +00-02-118, 2MASX J00401757+0245235, PGC 2420.

NGC 208 is a spiral galaxy located approximately 229 million light-years from the Solar System in the constellation Pisces. It was discovered on October 5, 1863, by Albert Marth.

== Supernova ==
One supernova has been observed in NGC 208: SN 2024luo (type Ia, mag. 17.2).

== See also ==
- Spiral galaxy
- List of NGC objects (1–1000)
- Pisces (constellation)
