= NGC 445 =

Galaxy in the constellation Cetus

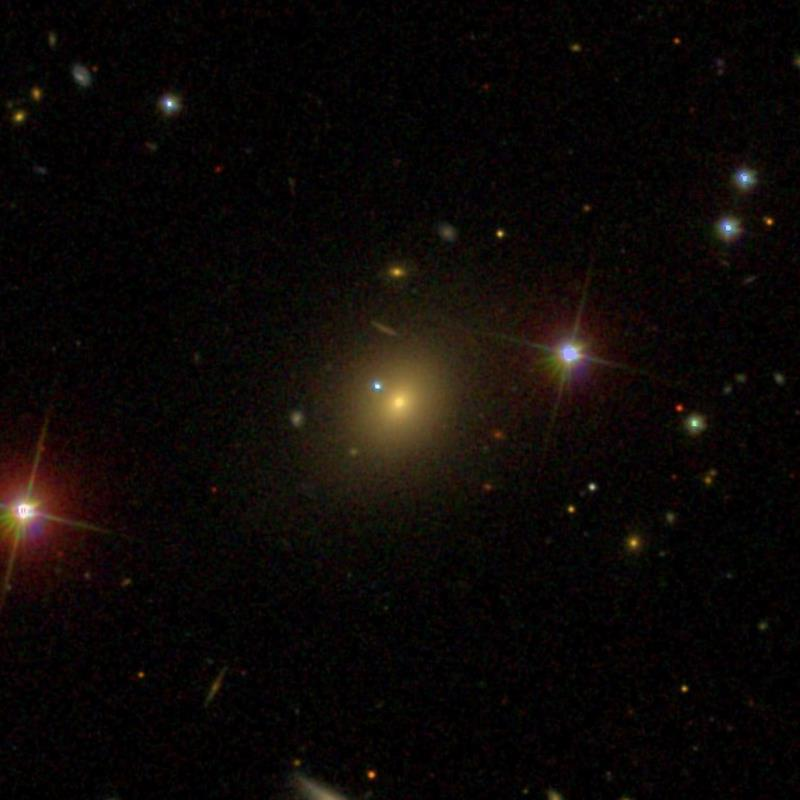
- NGC 445 as seen on SDSS

Observation data (J2000 epoch)
- Constellation: Cetus
- Right ascension: 01^{h} 14^{m} 52.5^{s}
- Declination: +01° 55′ 03″
- Redshift: 0.038236
- Heliocentric radial velocity: 11,463 km/s
- Apparent magnitude (V): 15.14
- Absolute magnitude (V): -20.84

Characteristics
- Type: S0 pec?
- Apparent size (V): 0.8' × 0.6'

Other designations
- CGCG 385-047, 2MASX J01145247+0155030, PGC 4493.

NGC 445 is a peculiar lenticular galaxy located in the constellation of Cetus. It was discovered on October 23, 1864, by Albert Marth. It was described by Dreyer as "very faint, very small."
