= NGC 998 =

Galaxy in the constellation Cetus

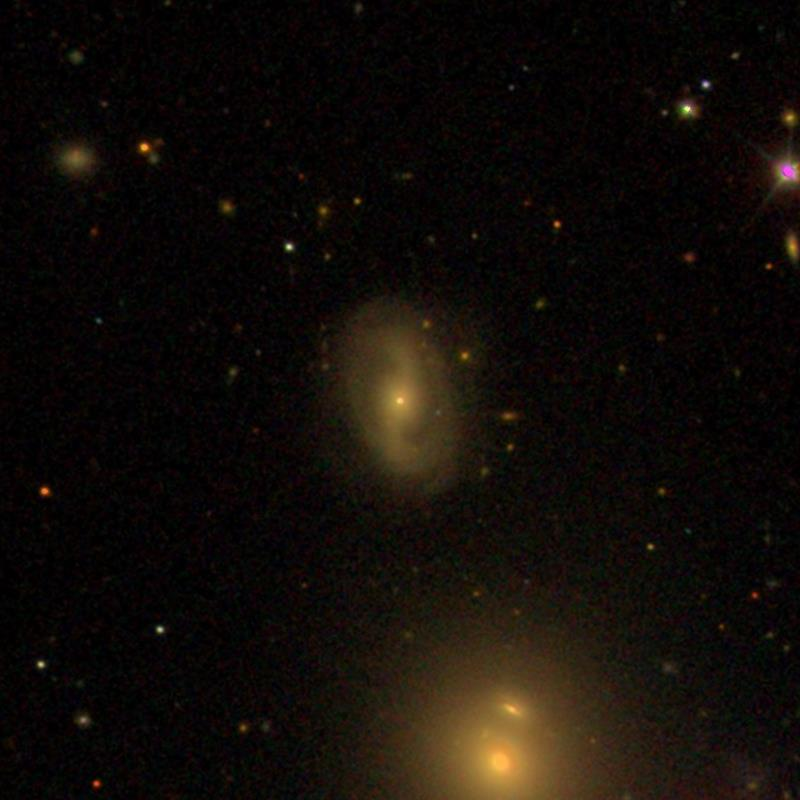
- SDSS image of NGC 998

Observation data (J2000 epoch)
- Constellation: Cetus
- Right ascension: 02^{h} 37^{m} 16.50891^{s}
- Declination: +07° 20′ 08.7169″
- Redshift: 0.02184
- Heliocentric radial velocity: 6476 km/s
- Distance: 303.7 ± 21.4 Mly (93.11 ± 6.56 Mpc)
- Apparent magnitude (B): 14.6
- Absolute magnitude (V): -23.46 +/- 0.51

Characteristics
- Type: S?

Other designations
- MCG +01-07-015, PGC 9934

NGC 998 is a spiral galaxy in the constellation Cetus. It is estimated to be 294 million light years from the Milky Way and has a diameter of approximately 90,000 ly. Together with NGC 997, it forms a gravitationally bound pair of galaxies. NGC 998 was discovered by astronomer Albert Marth on 10 November 1863 using a 48-inch telescope.

== See also ==
- List of NGC objects (1–1000)
