= NGC 141 =

Lenticular galaxy in Pisces

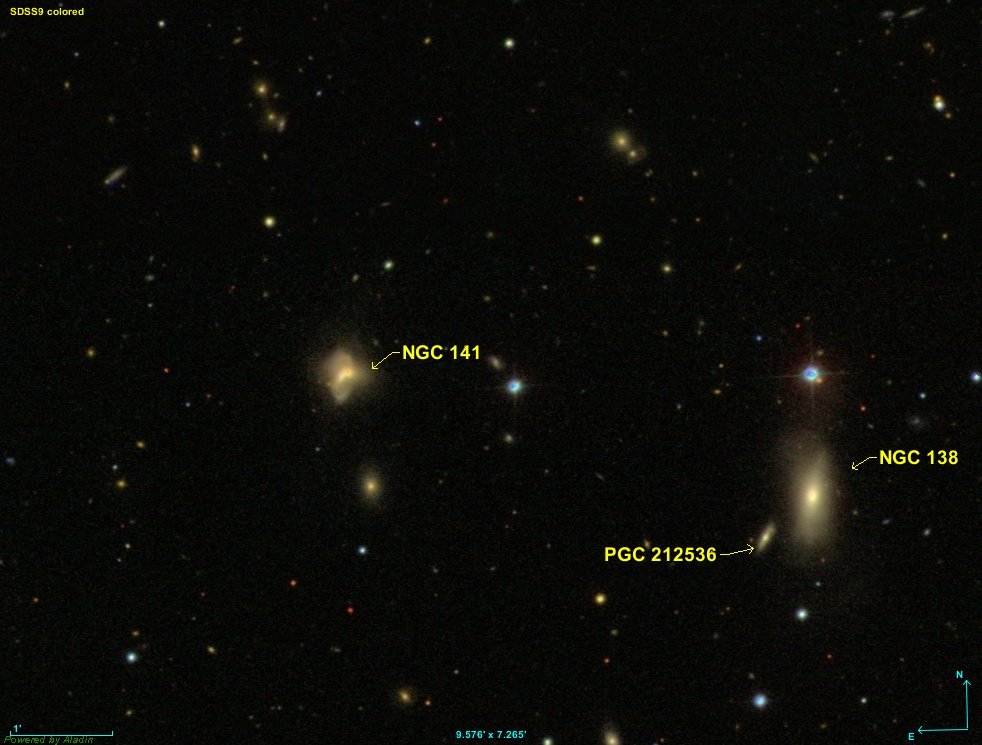
- NGC 141 and its surroundings

Observation data (J2000 epoch)
- Constellation: Pisces
- Right ascension: 00^{h} 31^{m} 17.4^{s}
- Declination: +05° 10′ 47″
- Redshift: 0.039227
- Heliocentric radial velocity: 11760 km/s
- Apparent magnitude (V): 15.4

Characteristics
- Type: SBab
- Notable features: "Very faint, very small, irregularly round."

Other designations
- PGC 1918

NGC 141 is a lenticular galaxy in the constellation of Pisces. Discovered by Albert Marth on August 29, 1864, it is about 525 million light-years away and is approximately 100,000 light-years across.
