= NGC 236 =

Galaxy in the constellation Pisces

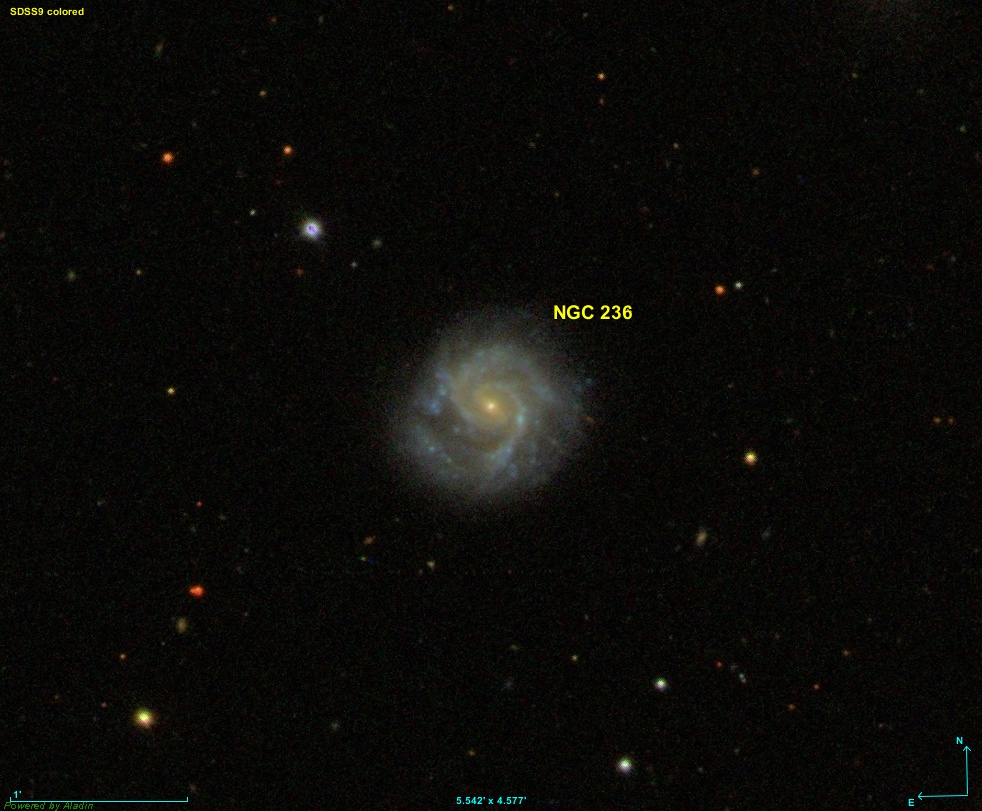
- NGC 0236 SDSS.

Observation data (J2000 epoch)
- Constellation: Pisces
- Right ascension: 00^{h} 43^{m} 27.5^{s}
- Declination: +02° 57′ 29″
- Redshift: 0.018823
- Apparent magnitude (V): 14.21

Characteristics
- Type: Sc
- Apparent size (V): 1.1' × 1.0'

Other designations
- UGC 462, CGCG 383-080, MCG +00-03-001, 2MASX J00432754+0257295, IRAS 00409+0241, PGC 2596.

NGC 236 is a spiral galaxy located in the constellation Pisces. It was discovered on August 3, 1864 by Albert Marth.
