= NGC 359 =

Elliptical galaxy in the constellation Cetus

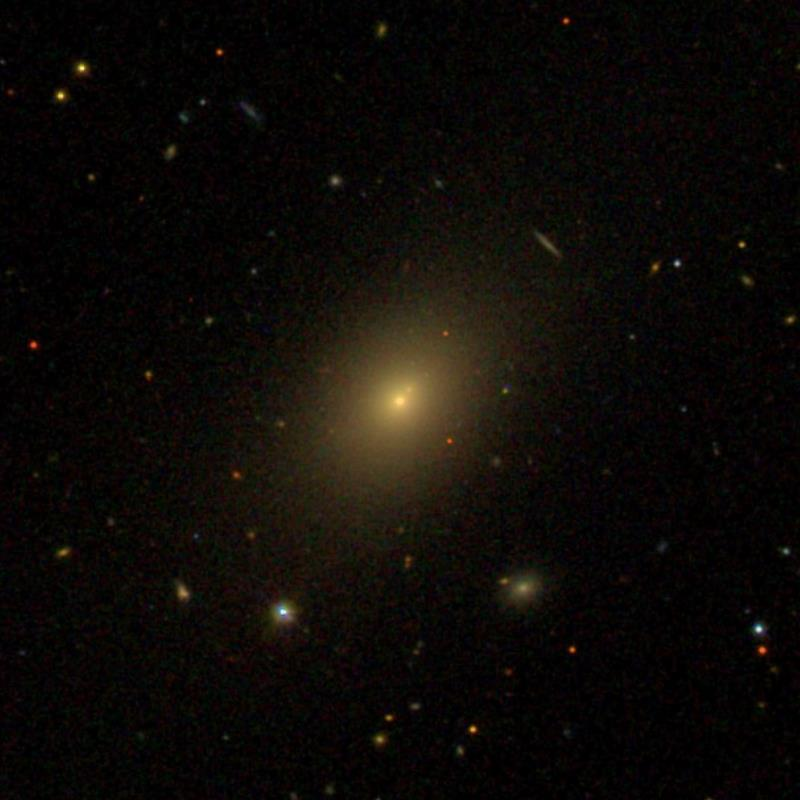
- SDSS view of NGC 359

Observation data (J2000 epoch)
- Constellation: Cetus
- Right ascension: 01^{h} 04^{m} 16.9^{s}
- Declination: −00° 45′ 54″
- Redshift: 0.017803
- Heliocentric radial velocity: 5,337 km/s
- Distance: 238 Mly
- Apparent magnitude (V): 14.3g

Characteristics
- Type: E0
- Apparent size (V): 1.10' × 0.78'

Other designations
- UGC 00662, CGCG 384-066, MCG +00-03-066, 2MASX J01041697-0045532, 2MASXi J0104169-004555, PGC 3817.

NGC 359 is an elliptical galaxy located approximately 238 million light-years from the Solar System in the constellation Cetus. It was discovered on September 2, 1864, by Albert Marth. It was described by Dreyer as "extremely faint, very small."

This elliptical galaxy has an extremely long tidal tail and shell structure, seen across several deep-sky surveys, indicating a likely-recent and possibly ongoing interaction with nearby galactic neighbor NGC 364.

== See also ==
- List of NGC objects (1–1000)
