= NGC 7517 =

Galaxy in the constellation Pisces

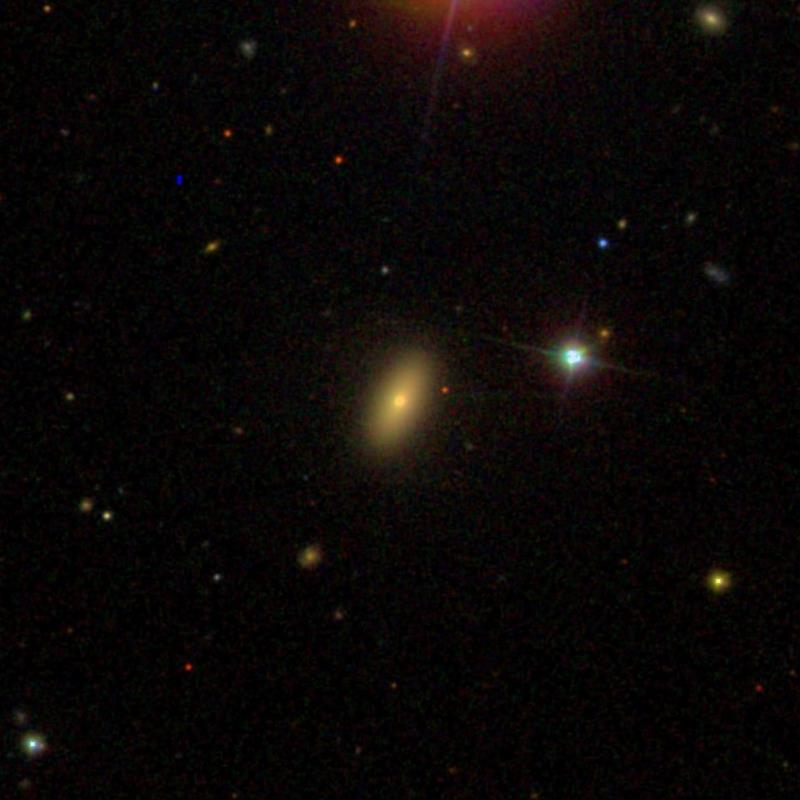

Observation data
- Constellation: Pisces
- Right ascension: 23^{h} 14^{m} 34^{s}
- Declination: −01° 57′ 31″

NGC 7517 is an elliptical galaxy located in the constellation Pisces. It was discovered on August 29, 1863, by the astronomer Albert Marth.
