= NGC 7838 =

Spiral or lenticular galaxy in the constellation Pisces

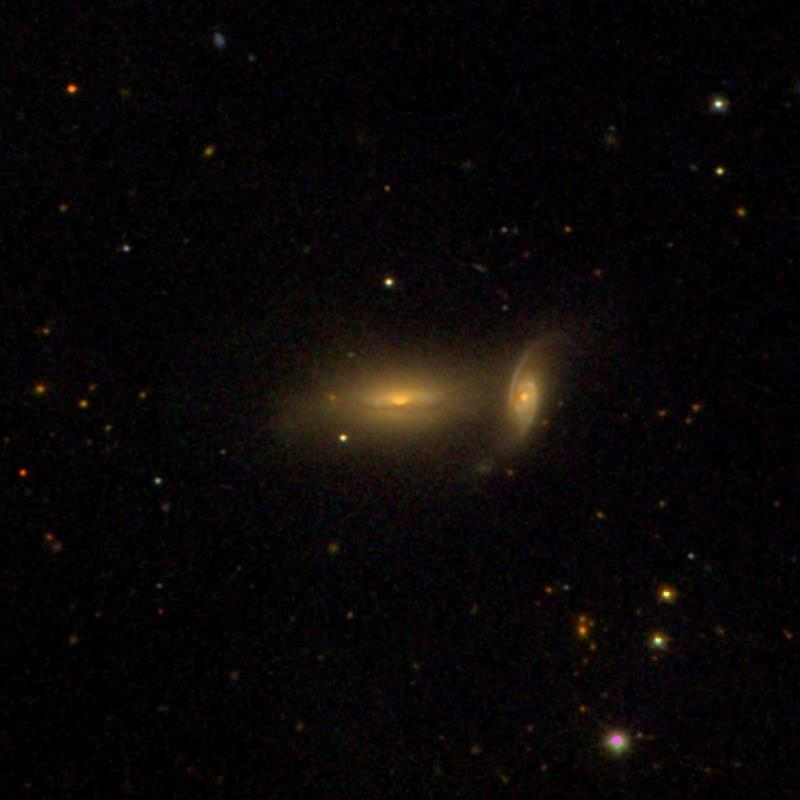
- SDSS image of NGC 7838. The galaxy NGC 7837 can be seen to the right of NGC 7838.

Observation data (J2000 epoch)
- Constellation: Pisces
- Right ascension: 00^{h} 06^{m} 53.9^{s}
- Declination: 08° 21′ 03″
- Redshift: 0.038713
- Heliocentric radial velocity: 11606 km/s
- Distance: 500 Mly (153 Mpc)
- Apparent magnitude (V): 16
- Apparent magnitude (B): 15.3
- Magnitude (J): 11.475
- Magnitude (H): 10.812
- Magnitude (K): 10.477

Characteristics
- Type: S0-a
- Size: ~89,000 ly (27.3 kpc) (estimated)
- Apparent size (V): 0.6 x 0.3

Other designations
- ARP 246 NED02, CGCG 408-034 NED02, MCG +01-01-036, PGC 000525

NGC 7838 is a spiral or lenticular galaxy located about 500 million light-years away in the constellation of Pisces. The galaxy was discovered by astronomer Albert Marth on November 29, 1864. NGC 7838 appears to interact with NGC 7837 forming Arp 246.

== See also ==
- List of NGC objects (7001–7840)
