= NGC 7572 =

Galaxy in the constellation Pegasus

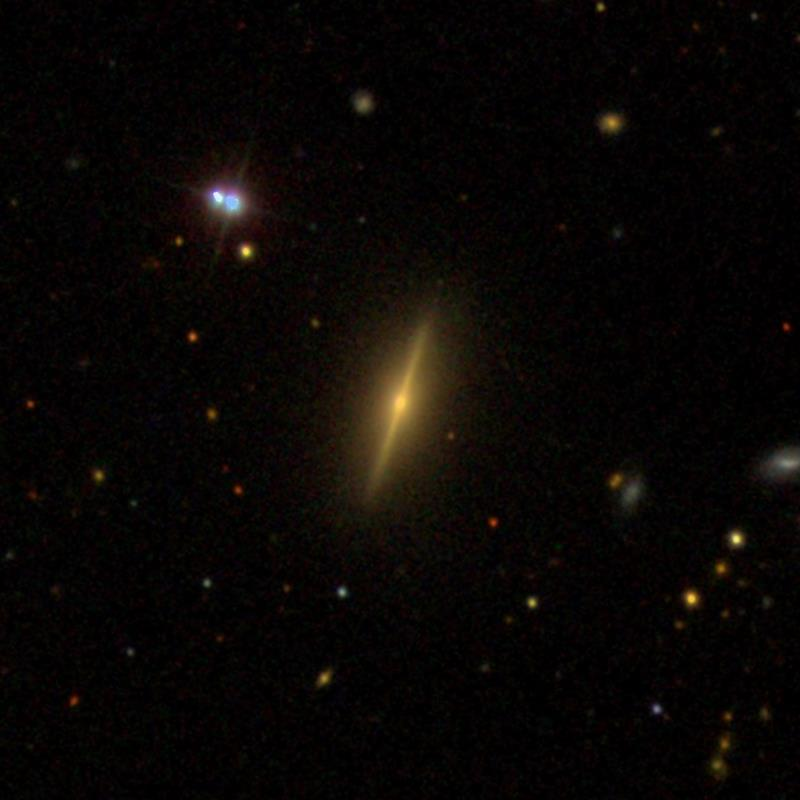
- SDSS image of NGC 7572

Observation data
- Constellation: Pegasus
- Right ascension: 23^{h} 18^{m} 07^{s}
- Declination: +18° 37′ 31″

NGC 7572 is a lenticular galaxy located in the constellation Pegasus. It is at a distance of about 580 million light-years away from Earth. It was discovered on November 3, 1864, by the astronomer Albert Marth.
