= NGC 7516 =

Galaxy in the constellation Pegasus

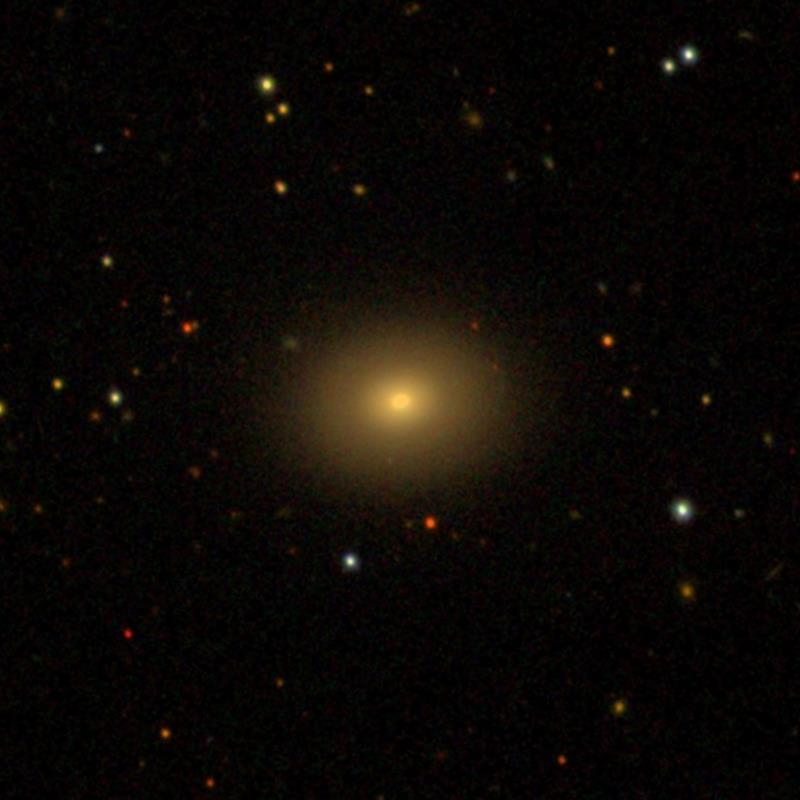

Observation data
- Constellation: Pegasus
- Right ascension: 23^{h} 14^{m} 09^{s}
- Declination: +20° 23′ 24″

NGC 7516 is a lenticular galaxy in the constellation Pegasus. It was discovered on September 5, 1864, by the German astronomer Albert Marth.
