= NGC 7811 =

Galaxy in the constellation Pisces

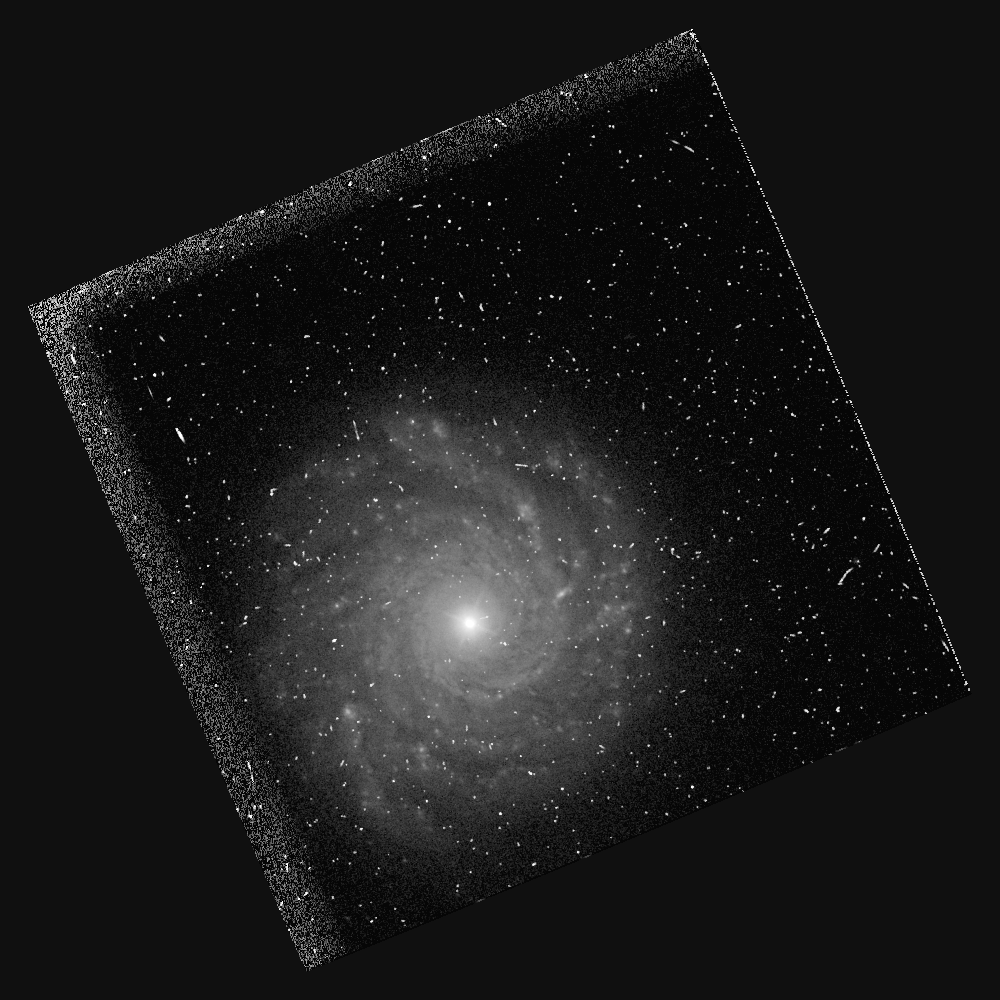
- NGC 7811 imaged by the Hubble Space Telescope

Observation data
- Constellation: Pisces
- Right ascension: 00^{h} 03^{m} 45^{s}
- Declination: +03° 29′ 47″

NGC 7811 is an irregular galaxy located in the constellation Pisces. It was discovered on October 5, 1864, by the astronomer Albert Marth.
