= NGC 4249 =

Lenticular Galaxy in the constellation Virgo

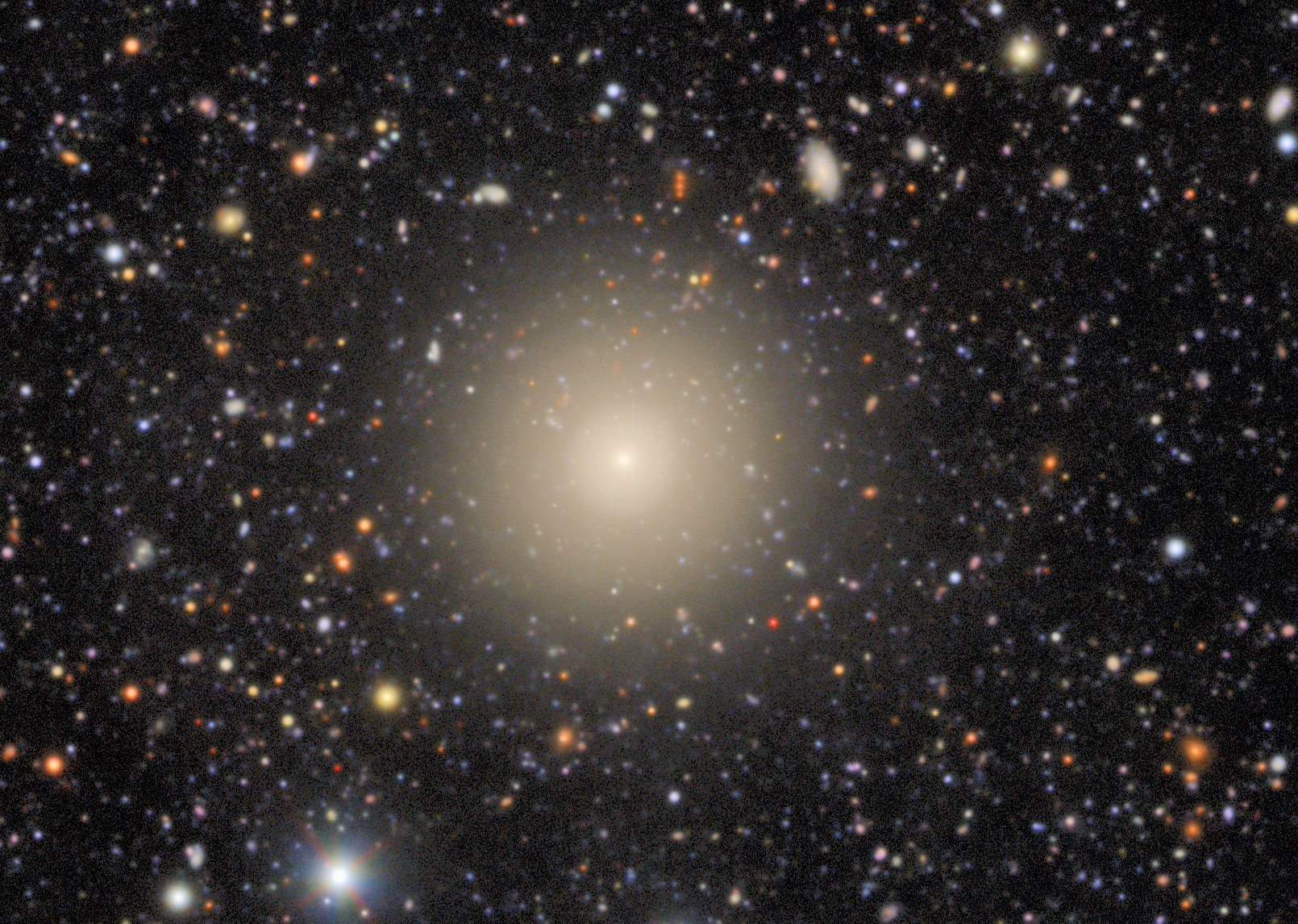
- NGC 4249 image by Vera C. Rubin Observatory

Observation data (J2000 epoch)
- Constellation: Virgo
- Right ascension: 12^{h} 17^{m} 59.3869^{s}
- Declination: +05° 35′ 55.018″
- Distance: 142 Mly

Other designations
- NGC 4249, VCC 0266, CGCG 041-068, CGCG 1215.4+0552, MCG +01-31-039

NGC 4249 is a lenticular galaxy located in the constellation Virgo and was discovered by the German astronomer Albert Marth in 1864 . Its speed relative to the cosmic microwave background is 2956 ± 24 km/s, which corresponds to a Hubble distance of 43.6 ± 3.1 Mpc (~142 million light- years).

== Virgin's Cluster ==
Although NGC 4249 does not appear in any galaxy group in the consulted sources, the designation VCC 266 (Virgo Cluster Catalog) indicates that this galaxy should be part of the Virgo Cluster. But, like the galaxies in the NGC 4235 group, it is located at the far edge of the Virgo Cluster, which is one of the clusters along with the Local Group of the Virgo Supercluster.
