= NGC 4252 =

Spiral galaxy in the constellation Virgo

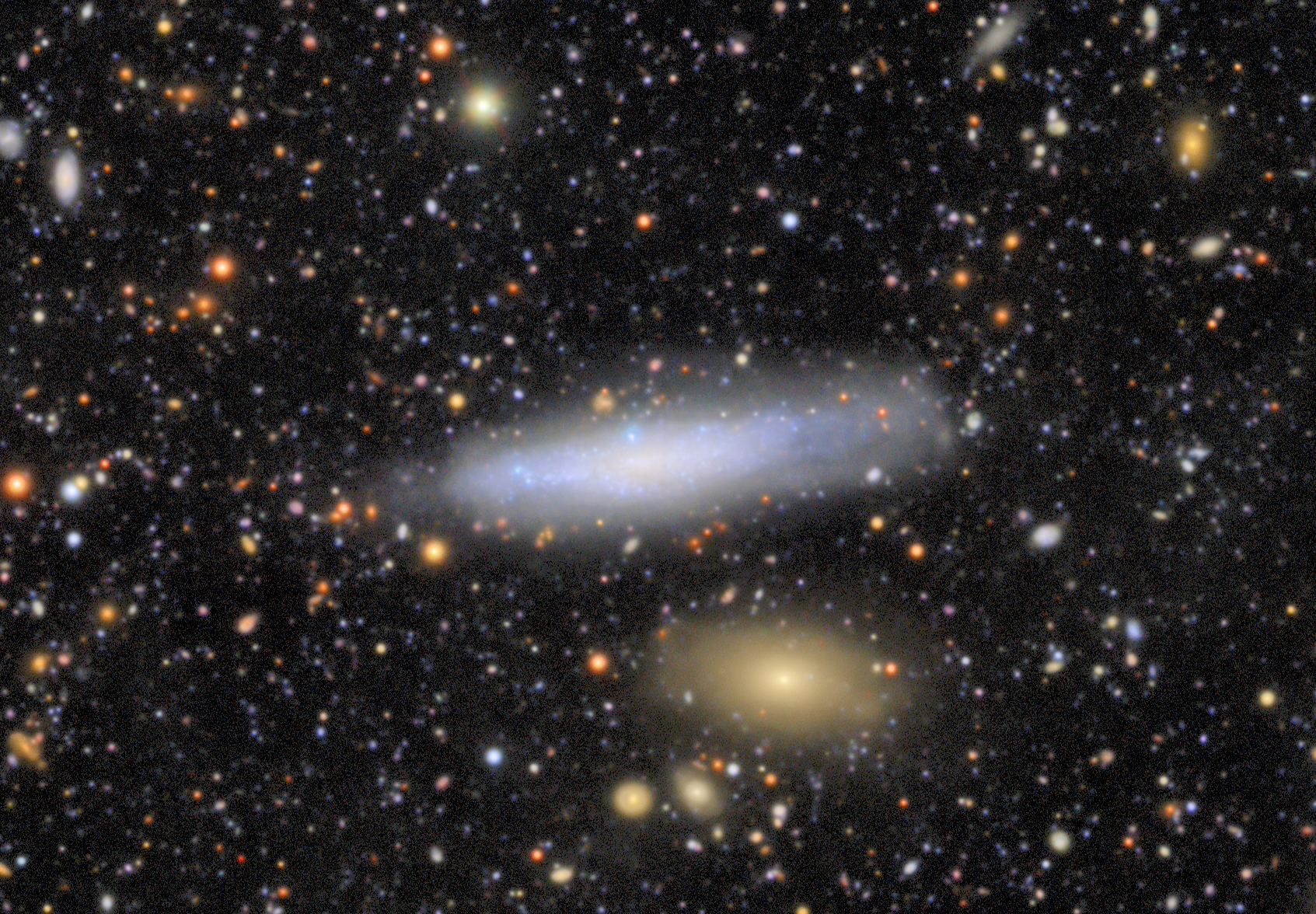
- NGC 4252 imaged by the Vera C. Rubin Observatory

Observation data (J2000.0 epoch)
- Constellation: Virgo
- Right ascension: 12^{h} 18^{m} 30.89^{s}
- Declination: +05° 33′ 34.10″
- Redshift: 0.002879
- Heliocentric radial velocity: 863 ± 10 km/s
- Distance: 56 Mly
- Apparent magnitude (V): 14.10
- Apparent magnitude (B): 14.90

Characteristics
- Type: Sc(f)
- Apparent size (V): 1.6 x 0.4

Other designations
- PGC 39537, MCG 1-31-45, UGC 7343

NGC 4252 is a spiral galaxy approximately 56 million light-years away from Earth in the constellation of Virgo. It belongs to the Virgo Cluster of galaxies.

It was discovered by German astronomer Albert Marth on May 26, 1864.

== See also ==
- List of NGC objects (4001–5000)
