= NGC 356 =

Spiral galaxy in the constellation Cetus

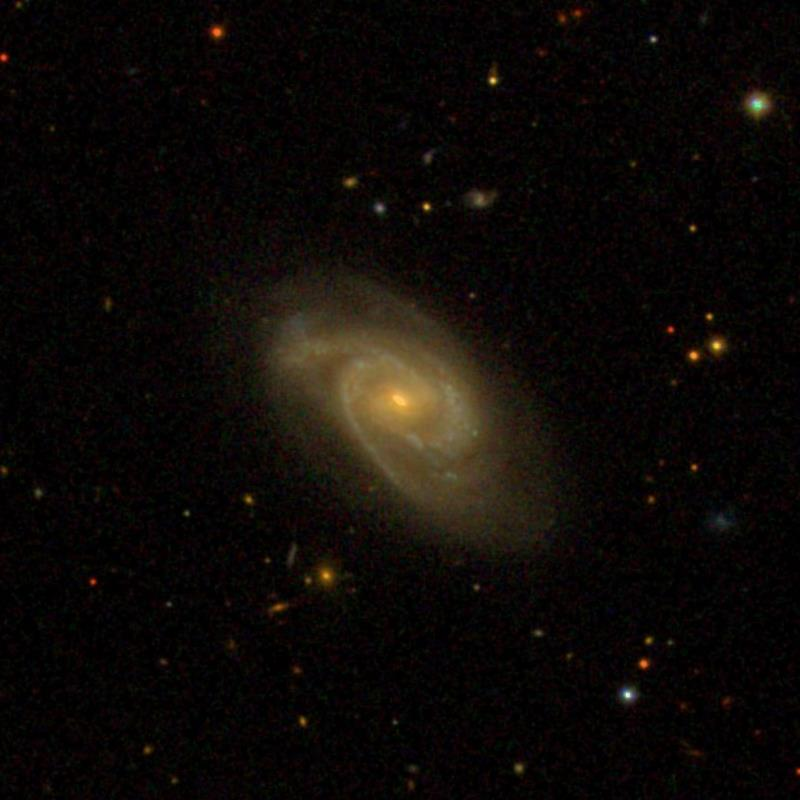
- SDSS image of NGC 356

Observation data (J2000 epoch)
- Constellation: Cetus
- Right ascension: 01^{h} 03^{m} 07.1^{s}
- Declination: −06° 59′ 18″
- Redshift: 0.019650
- Heliocentric radial velocity: 5,891 km/s
- Apparent magnitude (V): 14.08

Characteristics
- Type: SABbc
- Apparent size (V): 1.5' × 0.8'

Other designations
- MCG -01-03-078, 2MASX J01030710-0659182, 2MASXi J0103071-065918, IRAS 01005-0715, PGC 3754.

NGC 356 is a spiral galaxy in the constellation Cetus. It was discovered on September 27, 1864 by Albert Marth. It was described by Dreyer as "very faint, small, irregularly round."
