= NGC 7372 =

Galaxy in the constellation Pegasus

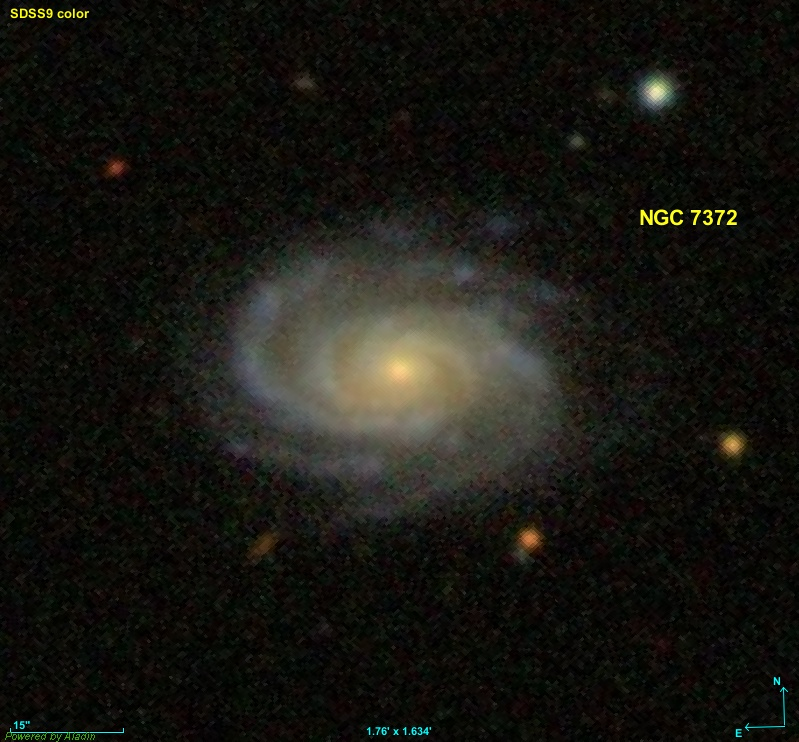
- NGC 7372 imaged by SDSS

Observation data (J2000 epoch)
- Constellation: Pegasus
- Right ascension: 22^{h} 45^{m} 45.9840^{s}
- Declination: +11° 07′ 51.096″
- Redshift: 0.039027±0.0000120
- Heliocentric radial velocity: 11,700±4 km/s
- Distance: 545.1 ± 38.2 Mly (167.14 ± 11.71 Mpc)
- Apparent magnitude (V): 14.36

Characteristics
- Type: S
- Size: ~162,700 ly (49.87 kpc) (estimated)
- Apparent size (V): 1.0′ × 0.9′

Other designations
- IRAS 22432+1051, 2MASS J22454596+1107512, MCG +02-58-005, PGC 69670, CGCG 430-004

NGC 7372 is a spiral galaxy in the constellation of Pegasus. Its velocity with respect to the cosmic microwave background is 11,332±26 km/s, which corresponds to a Hubble distance of 545.1 ± 38.2 Mly (167.14 ± 11.71 Mpc). It was discovered by German astronomer Albert Marth on 7 August 1864.

== Supernovae ==
Two supernovae have been observed in NGC 7372:

- SN 2009hj (Type II, mag. 19.1) was discovered by the Lick Observatory Supernova Search (LOSS) on 26 June 2009.
- SN 2010if (Type Ib, mag. 19.3) was discovered by LOSS on 26 September 2010.

== See also ==
- List of NGC objects (7001–7840)
