= NGC 5575 =

Galaxy in the constellation Virgo

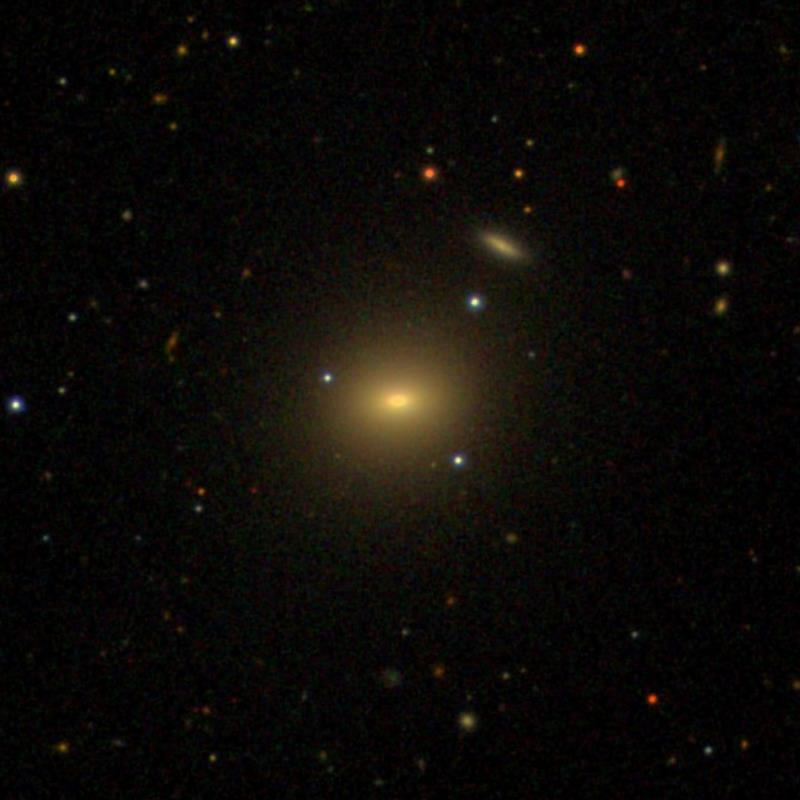
- SDSS image of NGC 5575

Observation data (J2000 epoch)
- Constellation: Virgo
- Right ascension: 14^{h} 20^{m} 59.374^{s}
- Declination: +06° 12′ 09.54″
- Redshift: 7651 km/s
- Heliocentric radial velocity: 0.025521
- Distance: 350 Mly (108 Mpc)
- Apparent magnitude (B): 14.5

Characteristics
- Type: S0
- Apparent size (V): 0.9′ × 0.9′

Other designations
- NGC 5578, UGC 9184, MCG +01-37-008, PGC 51272

NGC 5575 (also: NGC 5578) is a lenticular galaxy in the constellation Virgo. The object was discovered on May 8, 1864 by the German astronomer Albert Marth.

== See also ==
- List of NGC objects
