= NGC 7237 =

Galaxy in the constellation Pegasus

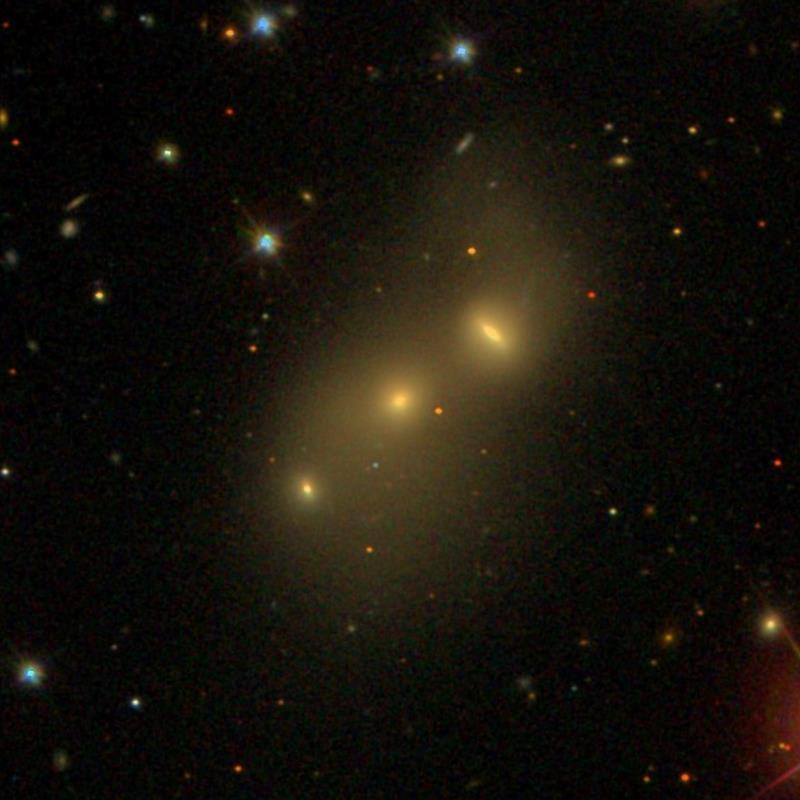
- NGC 7237 by PanSTARRS

Observation data (J2000 epoch)
- Constellation: Pegasus
- Right ascension: 22^{h} 14^{m} 46.9^{s}
- Declination: +13° 50′ 27″
- Redshift: 0.026213 ± 0.000007
- Heliocentric radial velocity: 7,858 ± 2 km/s
- Distance: 371 ± 99 Mly (114 ± 30.5 Mpc)
- Apparent magnitude (V): 13.9

Characteristics
- Type: SA0-
- Apparent size (V): 1.81′ × 0.72′
- Notable features: Interacting galaxy, radio galaxy

Other designations
- UGC 11958, Arp 169, II Zw 172, CGCG 428-058, MCG +02-56-024, 3C 442A, PGC 68383

NGC 7237 is an interacting lenticular galaxy located in the constellation Pegasus. It is located at a distance of about 350 million light years from Earth, which, given its apparent dimensions, means that NGC 7237 is about 240,000 light years across. NGC 7237 forms a pair with NGC 7236 and is a radio galaxy. It was discovered by Albert Marth on August 25, 1864.

NGC 7237 forms a pair with lenticular galaxy NGC 7236, which lies 35 arcseconds to the northwest. The two galaxies are undergoing a merger and are surrounded by hot gas (corona) with temperature of around 1 keV. The total mass of that gas is estimated to be 3×10^{10} M_{☉}. A smaller elliptical galaxy, NGC 7237C, lies 38 arcseconds southeast of NGC 7237. It is included in the Atlas of Peculiar Galaxies, in the category diffuse counter-tails. A tail is also visible in X-rays. The isophotes in the central region of NGC 7237 are irregular.

The galaxy pair is a source of radiowaves. The radio emission has a double lobe structure, with filaments, but no jets, while a weak core is identified as the nucleus of NGC 7237. The filaments could be created by the interaction of hot gas with the preexisting radio emitting plasma. Some bright radio sources are visible within the lobes but they could be background active galaxies. The core has been found to be variable source of X-rays.

== Gallery ==
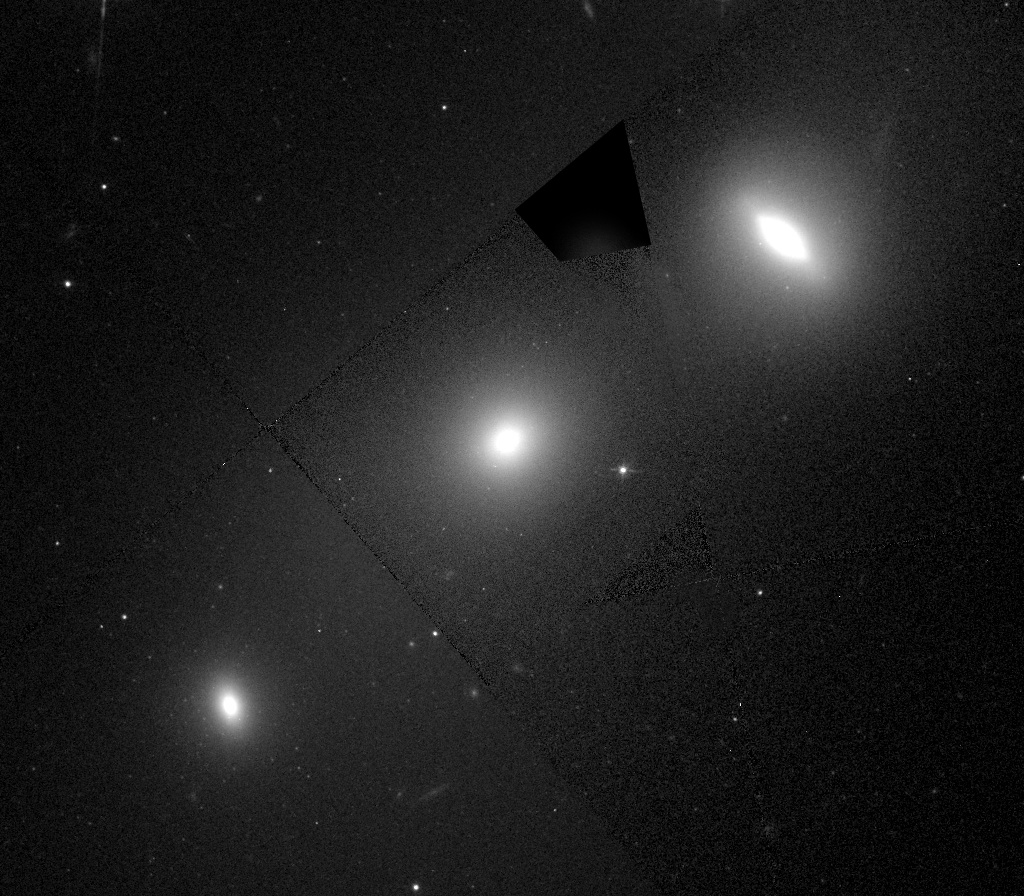
Arp 169 by the Hubble Space Telescope

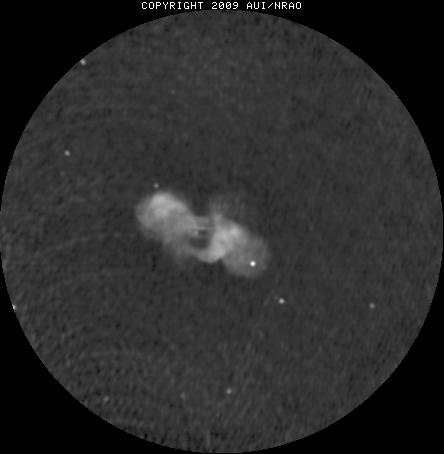
The radio emission of 3C 442 by the Very Large Array
