= NGC 164 =

Spiral galaxy in the constellation Pisces

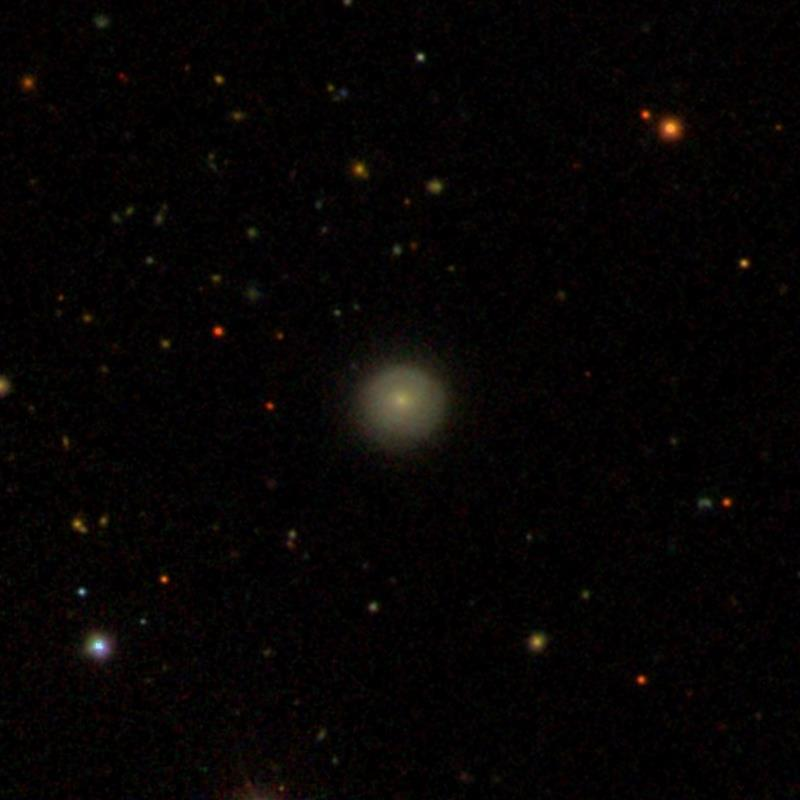
- SDSS image of NGC 164

Observation data (J2000.0 epoch)
- Constellation: Pisces
- Right ascension: 00^{h} 36^{m} 32.920^{s}
- Declination: +02° 44′ 59.17″
- Apparent magnitude (V): 15.7
- Apparent magnitude (B): 16

Characteristics
- Type: Sa:
- Apparent size (V): 0.4′ × 0..4′

Other designations
- MCG +00-02-089, PGC 2181

NGC 164 is a spiral galaxy located in the constellation Pisces. It was found by the German astronomer Albert Marth on 3 August 1864.
