= NGC 455 =

Lenticular galaxy in the constellation Pisces

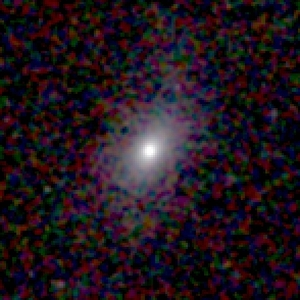
- NGC 455 as seen by 2MASS

Observation data (J2000 epoch)
- Constellation: Pisces
- Right ascension: 01^{h} 15^{m} 57.6^{s}
- Declination: +05° 10′ 43″
- Redshift: 0.019437
- Heliocentric radial velocity: 5,827 km/s
- Apparent magnitude (V): 13.55
- Absolute magnitude (V): -21.71

Characteristics
- Type: S?
- Apparent size (V): 1.9' × 1.2'

Other designations
- UGC 00815, CGCG 411-015, MCG +01-04-011, 2MASX J01155764+0510435, PGC 4572.

NGC 455 is a lenticular galaxy of type S? located in the constellation Pisces. It was discovered on October 27, 1864, by Albert Marth. It was described by Dreyer as "faint, very small, almost stellar."

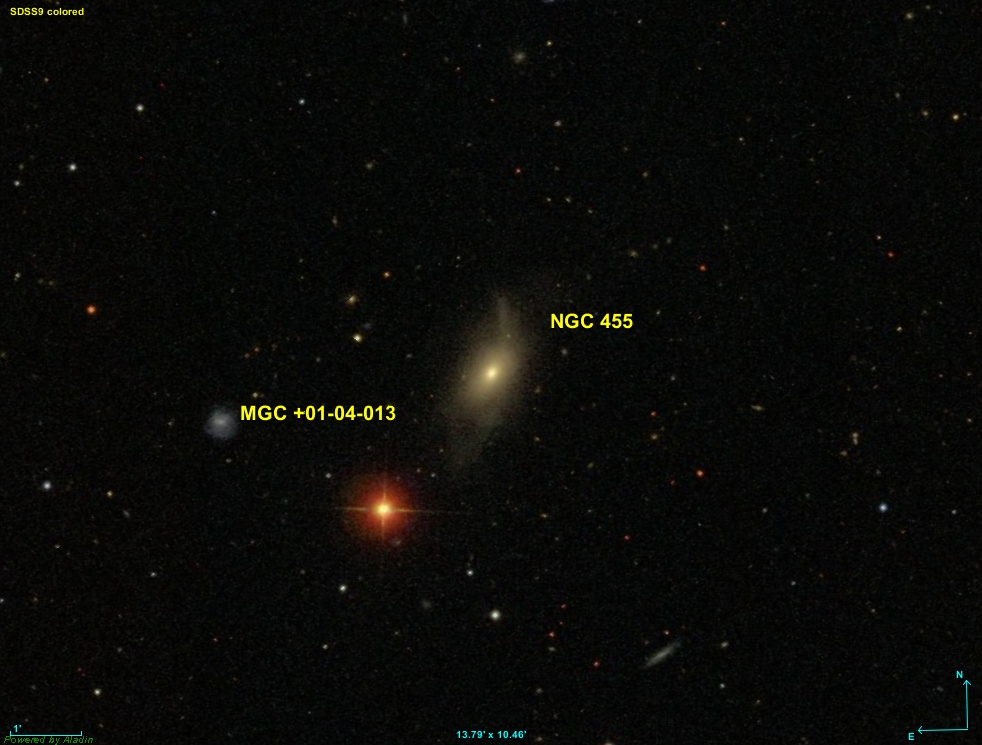
NGC 455 (SDSS)
