= NGC 435 =

Spiral galaxy in the constellation Cetus

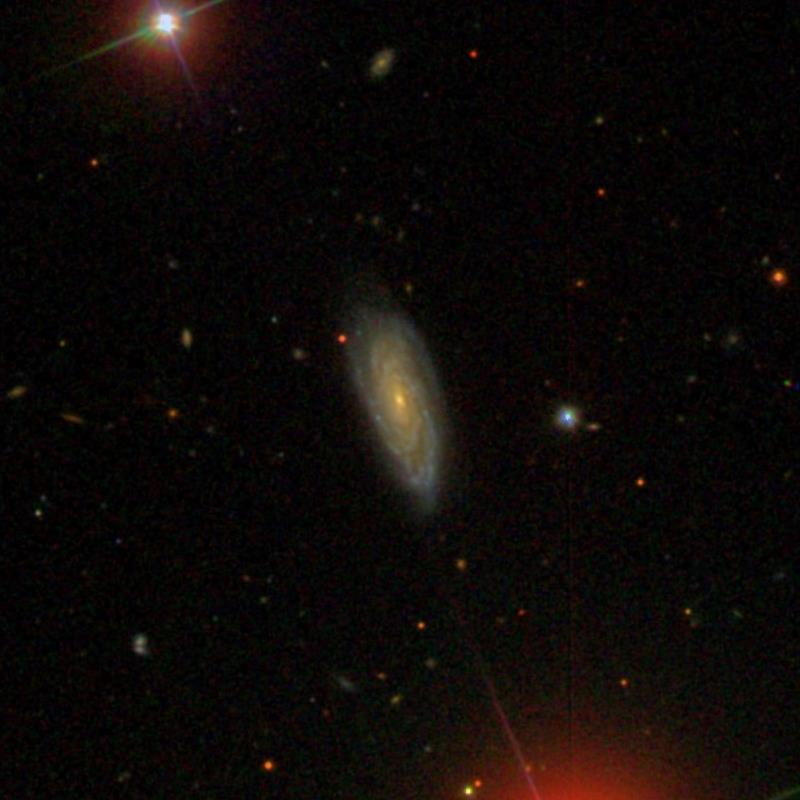
- NGC 435 as seen by SDSS

Observation data (J2000 epoch)
- Constellation: Cetus
- Right ascension: 01^{h} 13^{m} 59.80^{s}
- Declination: +02° 04′ 15.00″
- Redshift: 0.03425±0.00004
- Distance: 478.4 Mly (146.68 Mpc)
- Apparent magnitude (V): 14.81

Characteristics
- Type: SAB(s)d:
- Size: 196,000 ly
- Apparent size (V): 1.122' x 0.437'
- Notable features: N/A

Other designations
- MCG+00-04-046, PGC 4434, UGC 779, IRAS F01114+0148, 2MASX J01135985+0204171, Z 385-35, UZC J011359.9+020416, LEDA 4434

NGC 435 is an intermediate spiral galaxy located around 478 million light-years away in the constellation Cetus. NGC 435 was discovered on October 23, 1864 by Albert Marth, and it does not have an active galactic nucleus or much star-formation.

NGC 435 was described by John Louis Emil Dreyer as "extremely faint, small, extended."

== Gallery ==
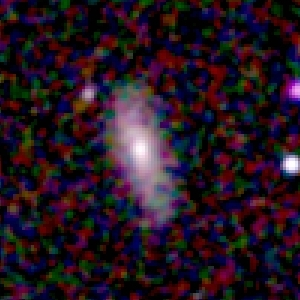
2MASS image of NGC 435

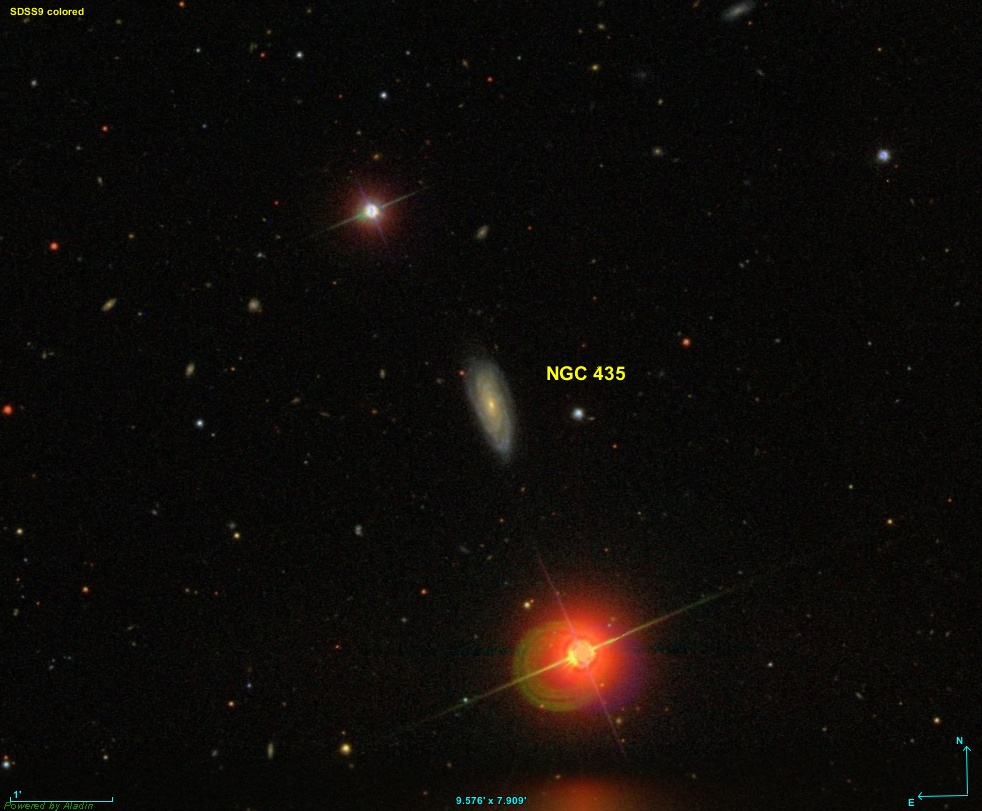
NGC 435 (SDSS)
