= NGC 505 =

Galaxy in the constellation Pisces

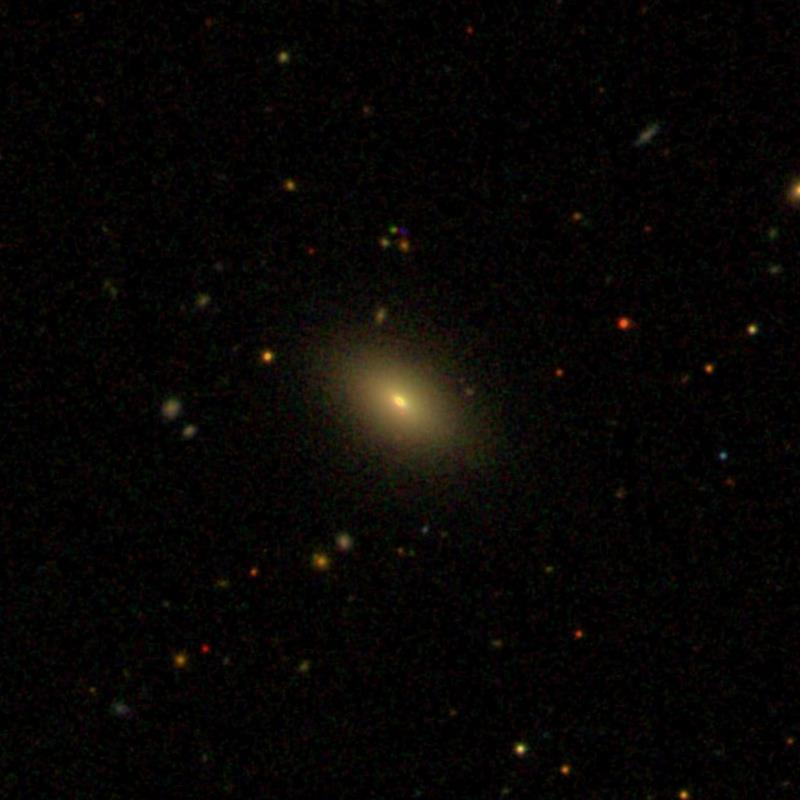
- NGC 505 (SDSS)

Observation data (J2000.0 epoch)
- Constellation: Pisces
- Right ascension: 01^{h} 22^{m} 57.10^{s}
- Declination: +09° 28′ 08.00″
- Redshift: 0.018556
- Heliocentric radial velocity: 5563 ± 29 km/s
- Distance: 234 Mly
- Apparent magnitude (V): 14.00
- Apparent magnitude (B): 15.00

Characteristics
- Type: S0
- Apparent size (V): 0.9 x 0.6

Other designations
- 2MASX J01225708+0928080, UGC 924, MCG +01-04-041, PGC 5036

NGC 505 is a lenticular galaxy approximately 234 million light-years away from Earth in the constellation of Pisces. It was discovered by German astronomer Albert Marth on October 1, 1864.

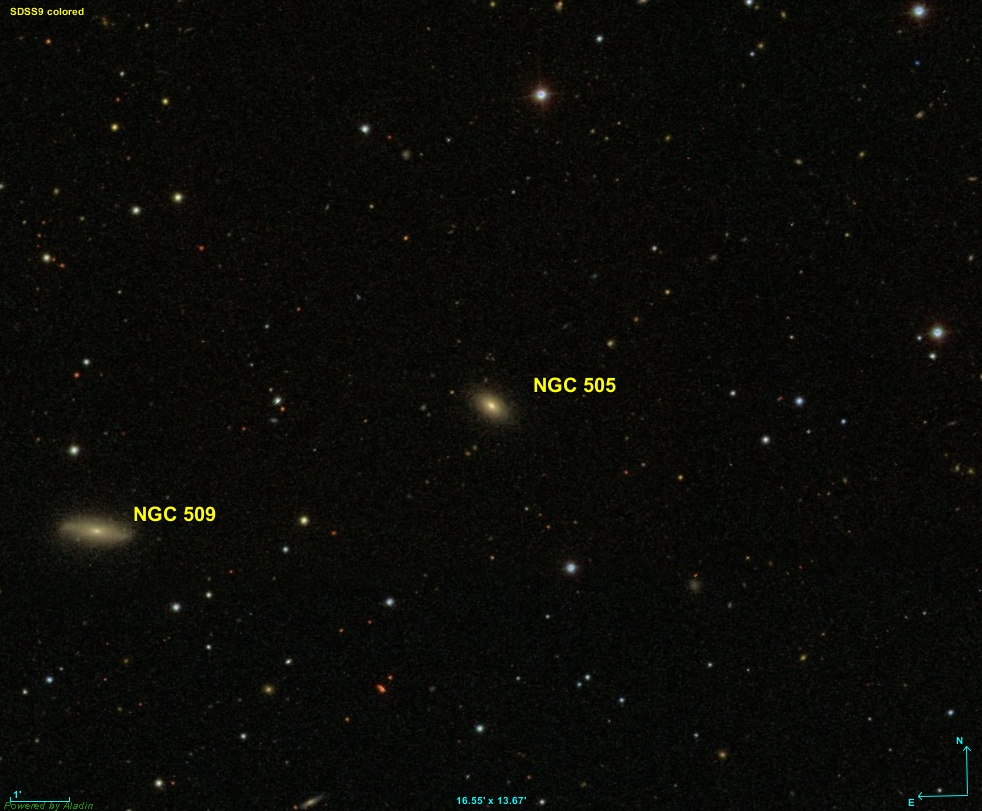
NGC 505 and NGC 509 (SDSS)

== See also ==
- Lenticular galaxy
- List of NGC objects (1–1000)
- Pisces
