= NGC 364 =

Barred lenticular galaxy in the constellation Cetus

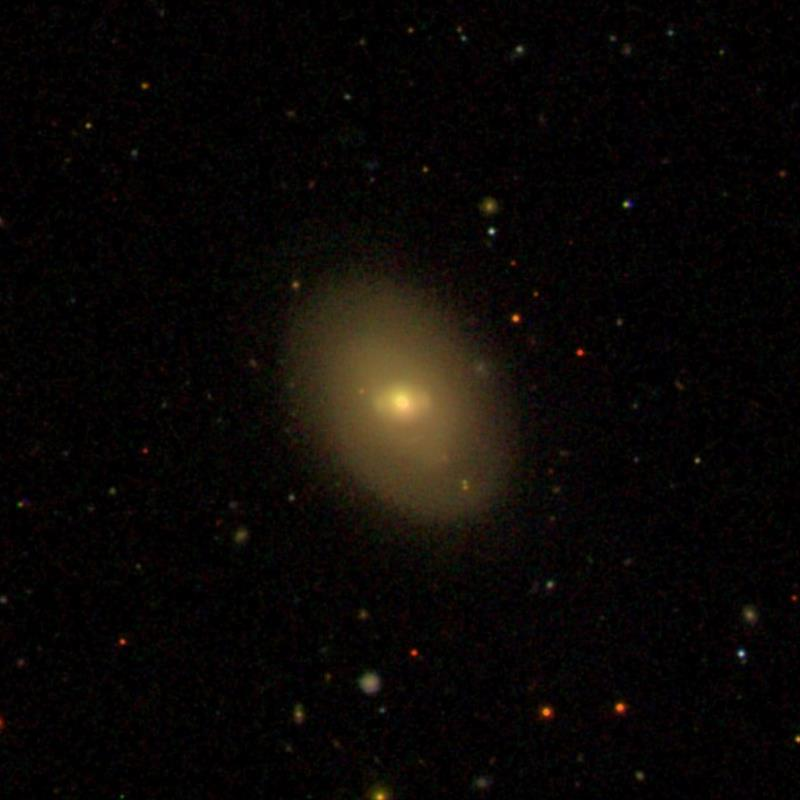
- SDSS image of NGC 364

Observation data (J2000 epoch)
- Constellation: Cetus
- Right ascension: 01^{h} 04^{m} 40.8^{s}
- Declination: −00° 48′ 10″
- Redshift: 0.017102
- Heliocentric radial velocity: 5,127 km/s
- Apparent magnitude (V): 13.8g

Characteristics
- Type: SB0
- Apparent size (V): 1.31' × 0.93'

Other designations
- UGC 00666, CGCG 384-067, MCG +00-03-069, 2MASX J01044087-0048095, 2MASXi J0104408-004809, 6dF J0104409-004810, PGC 3833.

NGC 364 is a barred lenticular galaxy in the constellation Cetus. It was discovered on September 2, 1864, by Albert Marth. It was described by Dreyer as "very faint, very small."

The galaxy is both visually and physically close to the elliptical galaxy NGC 359. A recent gravitational interaction between the two galaxies has created a large, faint tidal tail extending away from NGC 359 towards and below NGC 364. A small tidal star shell intersects this tail, strengthening the likelihood for a recent disturbance.
