= NGC 170 =

Lenticular galaxy in the constellation Cetus

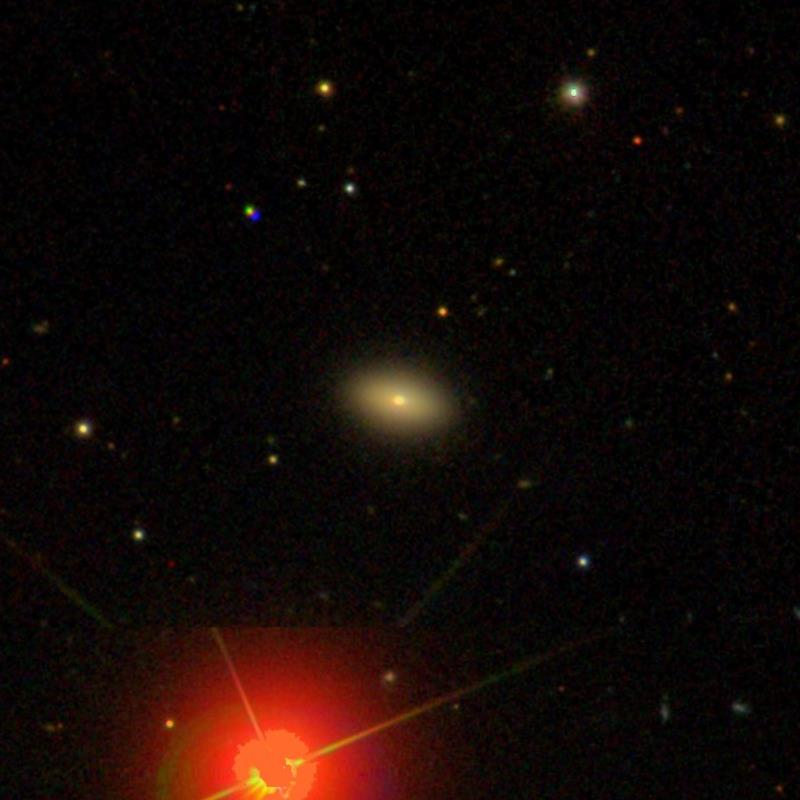
- NGC 170 as seen on SDSS

Observation data (J2000 epoch)
- Constellation: Cetus
- Right ascension: 00^{h} 36^{m} 45.8^{s}
- Declination: +01° 53′ 11″
- Redshift: 0.014240
- Apparent magnitude (V): 15.43

Characteristics
- Type: S0
- Apparent size (V): 0.4' × 0.3'

Other designations
- PGC 2195.

NGC 170 is a lenticular galaxy located in the constellation Cetus. It was discovered on 3 November 1863 by Albert Marth.

== See also ==
- List of NGC objects (1–1000)
