= NGC 509 =

Galaxy in the constellation Pisces

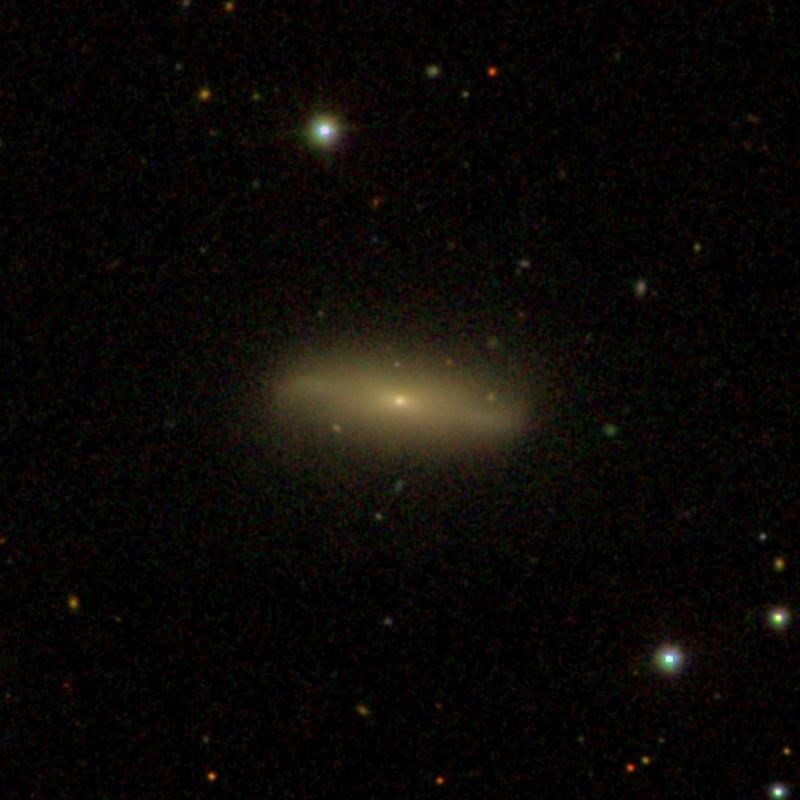
- NGC 509 (SDSS)

Observation data (J2000.0 epoch)
- Constellation: Pisces
- Right ascension: 01^{h} 23^{m} 24.10^{s}
- Declination: +09° 26′ 01.00″
- Redshift: 0.007542
- Heliocentric radial velocity: 2261 ± 5 km/s
- Distance: 87 Mly
- Apparent magnitude (V): 13.70
- Apparent magnitude (B): 14.60

Characteristics
- Type: S0?
- Apparent size (V): 1.6 x 0.6

Other designations
- UGC 932, MCG +01-04-045, PGC 5080

NGC 509 is a lenticular galaxy approximately 87 million light-years away from Earth in the constellation of Pisces. It was discovered by German astronomer Albert Marth on October 1, 1864.

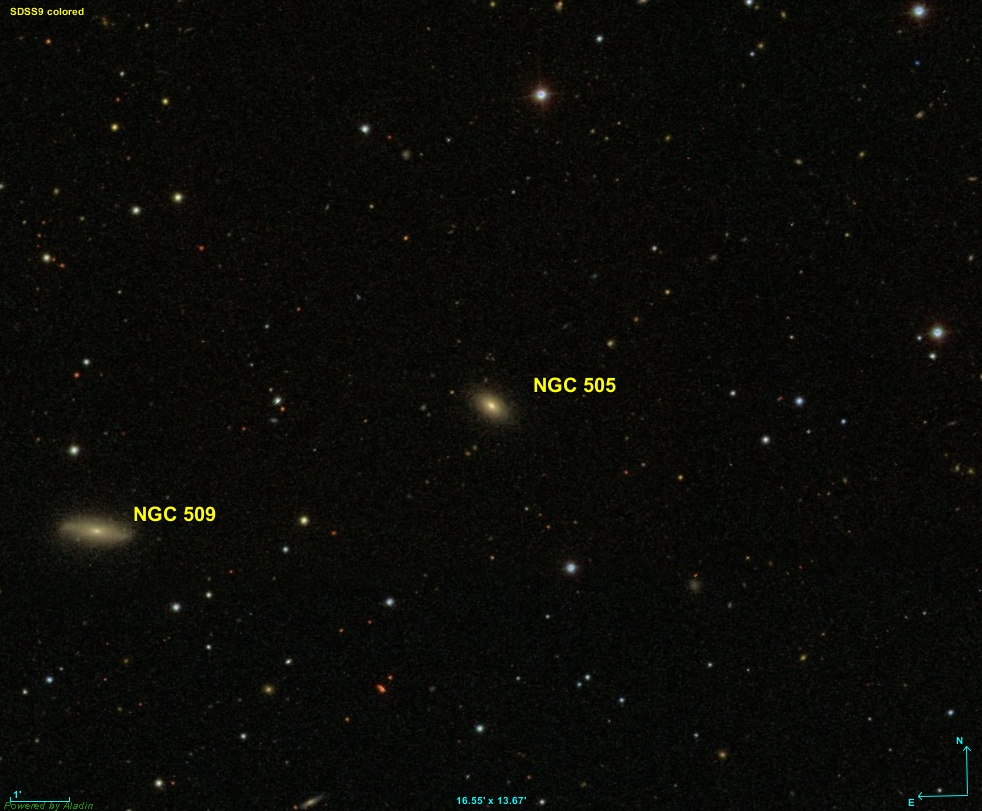
NGC 509 and NGC 505 (SDSS)

== See also ==
- List of NGC objects (1–1000)
