= NGC 7837 =

Galaxy in the constellation of Pisces

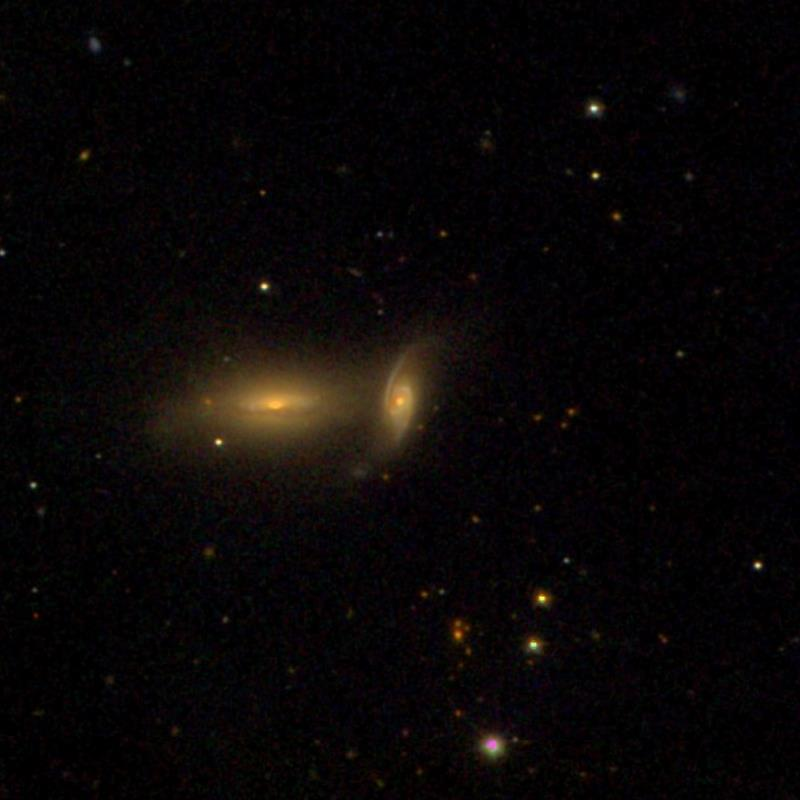
- SDSS image of NGC 7837. The galaxy NGC 7838 can be seen to the left of NGC 7837.

Observation data (J2000 epoch)
- Constellation: Pisces
- Right ascension: 00^{h} 06^{m} 51.4^{s}
- Declination: 08° 21′ 05″
- Redshift: 0.039507
- Heliocentric radial velocity: 10880 km/s
- Distance: 470 Mly (143 Mpc)
- Apparent magnitude (V): 16

Characteristics
- Type: Sb
- Size: ~55,000 ly (17 kpc) (estimated)
- Apparent size (V): 0.4 x 0.2

Other designations
- ARP 246 NED01, CGCG 408-034 NED01, MCG +01-01-035, NPM1G +08.0004, PGC 000516

NGC 7837 is a spiral galaxy located about 470 million light-years away in the constellation of Pisces. The galaxy was discovered by astronomer Albert Marth on November 29, 1864. NGC 7837 appears to interact with NGC 7838 forming Arp 246.

== See also ==
- List of NGC objects (7001–7840)
