= NGC 3362 =

Galaxy in the constellation Leo

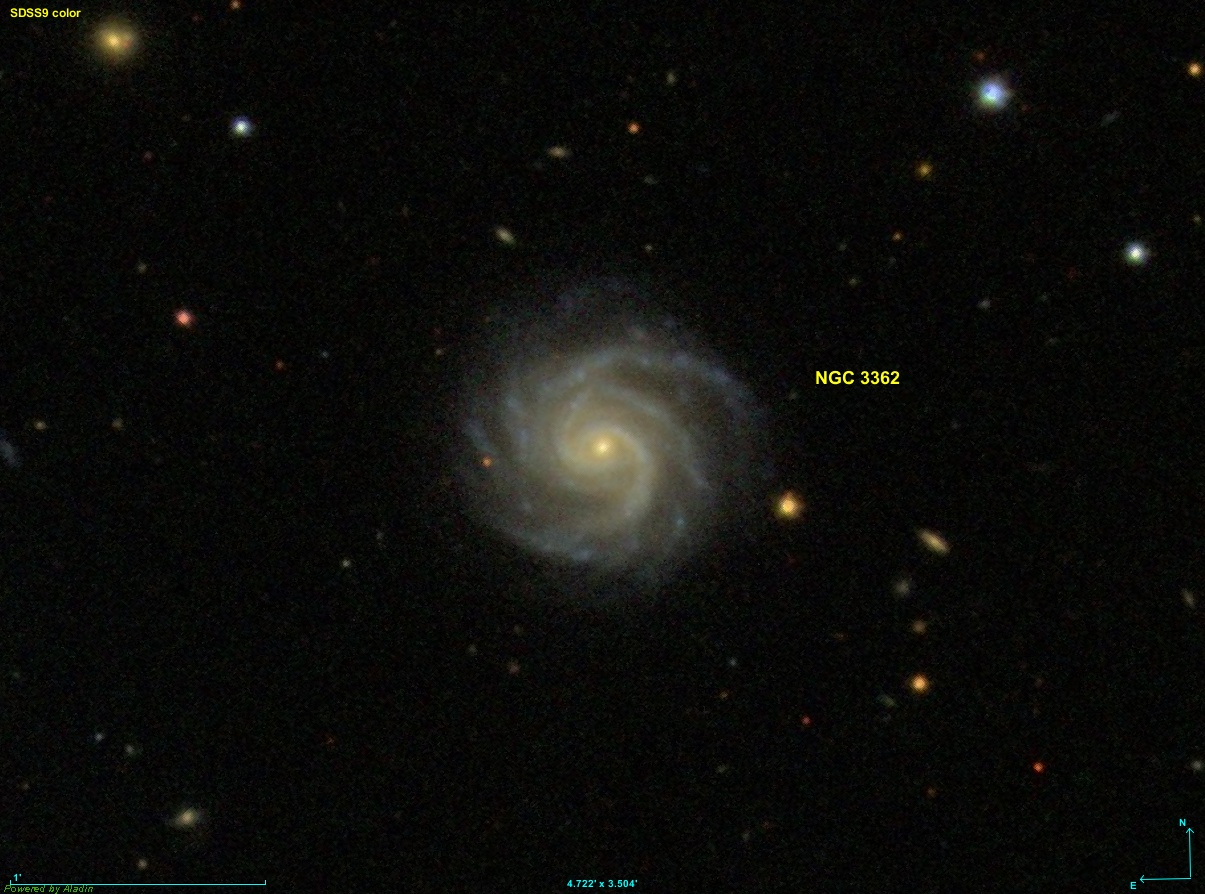
- NGC 3362 imaged by SDSS

Observation data (J2000 epoch)
- Constellation: Leo
- Right ascension: 10^{h} 44^{m} 51.7366^{s}
- Declination: +06° 35′ 48.595″
- Redshift: 0.027746
- Heliocentric radial velocity: 8318 ± 1 km/s
- Distance: 417.4 ± 29.3 Mly (127.97 ± 8.97 Mpc)
- Apparent magnitude (V): 12.8

Characteristics
- Type: SABc
- Size: ~137,100 ly (42.03 kpc) (estimated)
- Apparent size (V): 1.4′ × 1.1′

Other designations
- 2MASX J10445172+0635488, UGC 5857, MCG +01-28-005, PGC 32078, CGCG 038-007

NGC 3362 is an intermediate spiral galaxy in the constellation of Leo. Its velocity with respect to the cosmic microwave background is 8676 ± 25 km/s, which corresponds to a Hubble distance of 127.97 ± 8.97 Mpc (~417 million light-years). However, three non redshift measurements give a closer distance of 95.8 ± 3.984 Mpc (~312 million light-years). The galaxy was discovered by German astronomer Albert Marth on 22 March 1865.

The SIMBAD database lists NGC 3362 as a Seyfert II Galaxy, i.e. it has a quasar-like nuclei with very high surface brightnesses whose spectra reveal strong, high-ionisation emission lines, but unlike quasars, the host galaxy is clearly detectable.

The galaxies NGC 3362 and UGC 5892 are in the same region of the celestial sphere and about the same distance from the Milky Way. According to Abraham Mahtessian, they form a pair of galaxies.

== Supernovae ==
Three supernovae have been observed in NGC 3362:

- SN 2001Y (Type II-P, mag. 18.1) was discovered by LOTOSS (Lick Observatory and Tenagra Observatory Supernova Searches) on 3 March 2001.
- SN 2010ct (Type II, mag. 19.2) was discovered by the Lick Observatory Supernova Search (LOSS) on 15 May 2010.
- SN 2019cda (Type Ic, mag. 18.1) was discovered by the Italian Supernovae Search Project (ISSP) on 24 March 2019.

== Supermassive Black Hole ==
According to the authors of a paper published in 2002, the mass of the central black hole of NGC 3362 is 5.89 x 10^6 M_{☉}.

== See also ==
- List of NGC objects (3001–4000)
