= NGC 518 =

Spiral galaxy in the constellation Pisces

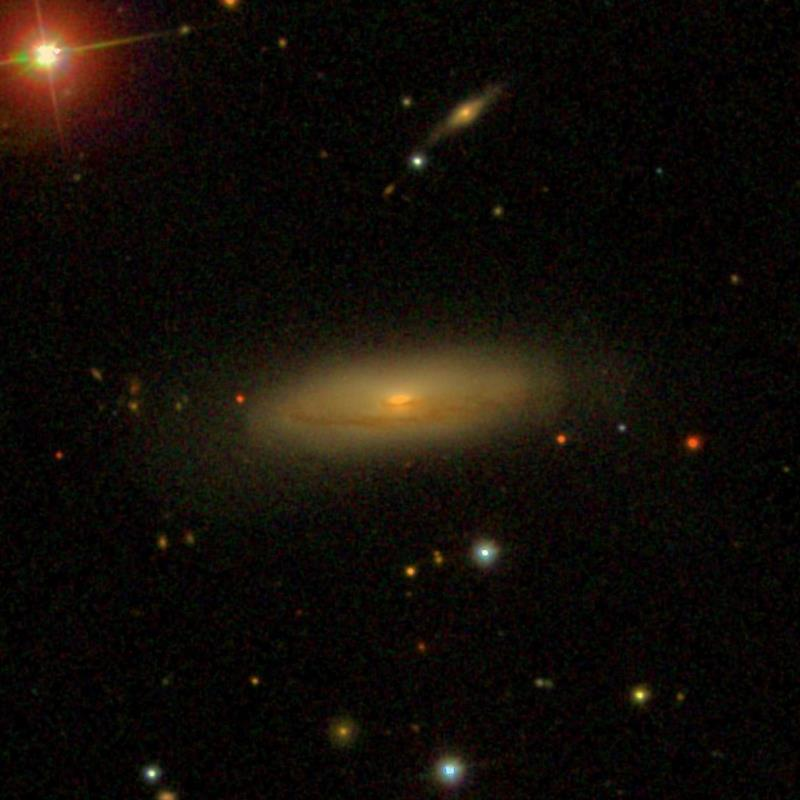
- NGC 518 as seen on SDSS

Observation data (J2000 epoch)
- Constellation: Pisces
- Right ascension: 01^{h} 24^{m} 17.7^{s}
- Declination: +09° 19′ 52″
- Redshift: 0.009053
- Heliocentric radial velocity: 2702 ± 11
- Distance: 122 Mly
- Apparent magnitude (V): 13.4
- Apparent magnitude (B): 14.4

Characteristics
- Type: Sa
- Apparent size (V): 1.6' × 0.6'

Other designations
- PGC 5161, UGC 952, MCG +01-04-049, CGCG 411-047

NGC 518 is a spiral galaxy located in the constellation Pisces. It was discovered by Albert Marth on 17 December 1864.

== See also ==
- List of NGC objects (1–1000)
