= NGC 350 =

Lenticular galaxy in the constellation Cetus

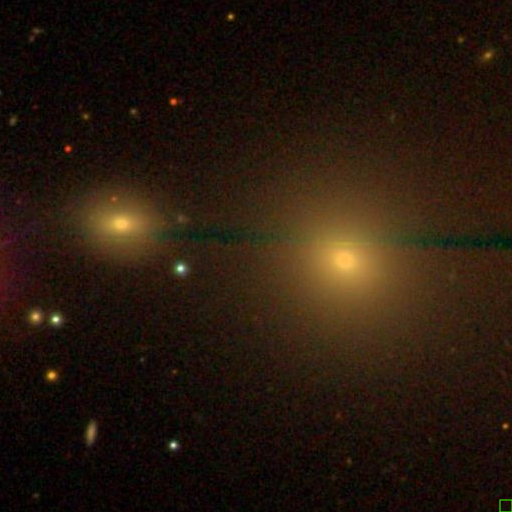
- SDSS image of NGC 350 (left) and NGC 349 (right)

Observation data (J2000 epoch)
- Constellation: Cetus
- Right ascension: 01^{h} 01^{m} 56.7^{s}
- Declination: −06° 47′ 45″
- Redshift: 0.020254
- Heliocentric radial velocity: 6,072 km/s
- Apparent magnitude (V): 15

Characteristics
- Type: S0
- Apparent size (V): 0.3' × 0.2'

Other designations
- MCG -01-03-069, 2MASX J01015671-0647444, 2MASXi J0101567-064744, PGC 3690.

NGC 350 is a lenticular galaxy in the constellation Cetus. It was discovered on September 27, 1864 by Albert Marth. It was described by Dreyer as "extremely faint."
