= NGC 7051 =

Galaxy in the constellation Aquarius

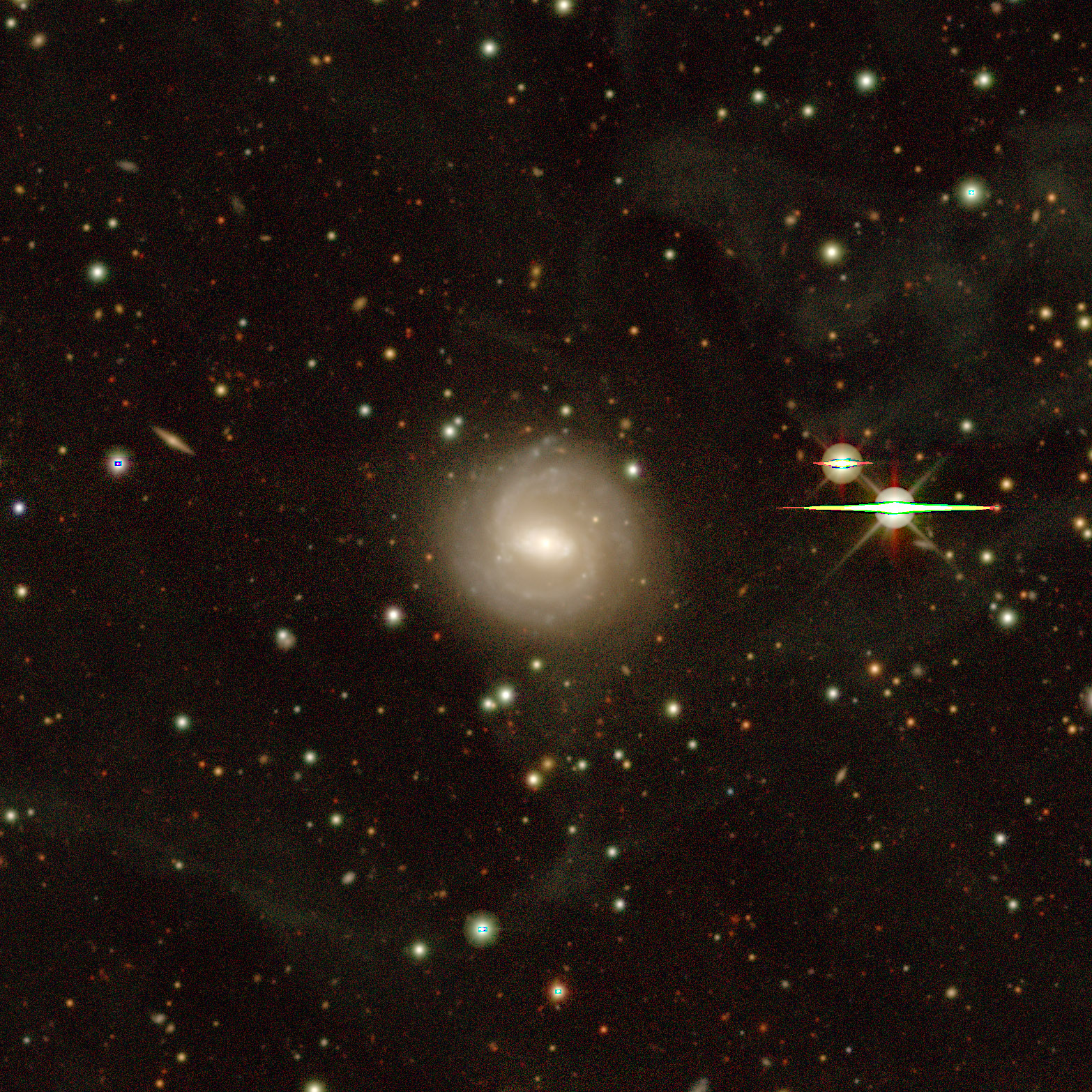
- The barred spiral galaxy NGC 7051, imaged by legacy surveys. The wispy clouds around this galaxy are foreground dust clouds in the Milky Way.

Observation data (J2000 epoch)
- Constellation: Aquarius
- Right ascension: 21^{h} 19^{m} 51.3^{s}
- Declination: −08° 46′ 59″
- Redshift: 0.008402
- Heliocentric radial velocity: 2,519 km/s
- Distance: 98.4 Mly
- Apparent magnitude (V): 12.9

Characteristics
- Type: SB(r)a pec
- Apparent size (V): 1.3 x 1.1

Other designations
- IRAS 21171-0859, MCG -2-54-4, PGC 66566

NGC 7051 is a barred spiral galaxy located about 100 million light-years away in the constellation of Aquarius. It was discovered by astronomer John Herschel on July 30, 1827.

On June 18, 2002 a type II supernova designated as SN 2002dq was discovered in NGC 7051.

== See also ==
- NGC 7042 – a completely unrelated spiral galaxy
