= NGC 3 =

Galaxy in the constellation Pisces

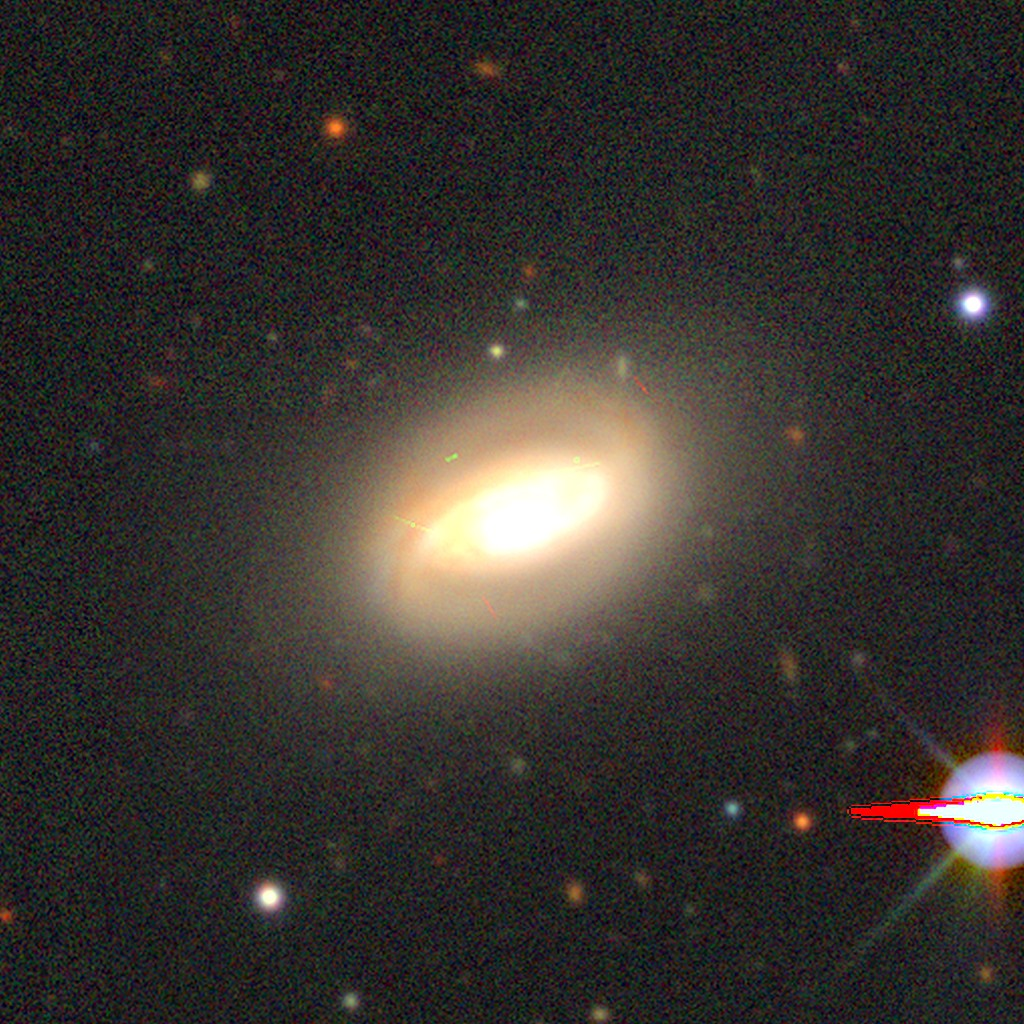
- NGC 3 by the DESI Legacy Surveys

Observation data (J2000 epoch)
- Constellation: Pisces
- Right ascension: 00^{h} 07^{m} 16.8^{s}
- Declination: +08° 18′ 06″
- Heliocentric radial velocity: 3900 ± 50 km/s
- Distance: 172 million light-years (53.9 mpc)
- Apparent magnitude (V): 14.2

Characteristics
- Type: S0
- Size: ~74,200 ly (22.75 kpc) (estimated)
- Apparent size (V): 1.1' × 0.6'

Other designations
- Ark 1, IRAS 00047+0801, 2MASX J00071680+0818058, UGC 58, PGC 565, CGCG 408-035.

NGC 3 is a lenticular galaxy located 172 million light-years from Earth in the constellation of Pisces. It was discovered on November 29, 1864, by Albert Marth.

It has the morphological type of S0. However other sources classify NGC 3 as a barred spiral galaxy as a type of SBa.

== Observational history ==
NGC 3 was discovered by the German astronomer Albert Marth on 29 November 1864 and was described as "faint, very small, round, almost stellar".

== Properties ==
NGC 3 is a lenticular galaxy, though other sources have referred to it as a barred spiral galaxy. It is located at a distance of about 172 million light-years from Earth, and has a magnitude of 14.2. NGC 3 appears to have a faint spiral arm structure, along with a weak bar.

== Listing in astronomical catalogues ==
The object is cataloged as UGC 58, PGC 565, Ark 1, MCG+01-01-037, and CGCG 408–35.

== Gallery ==
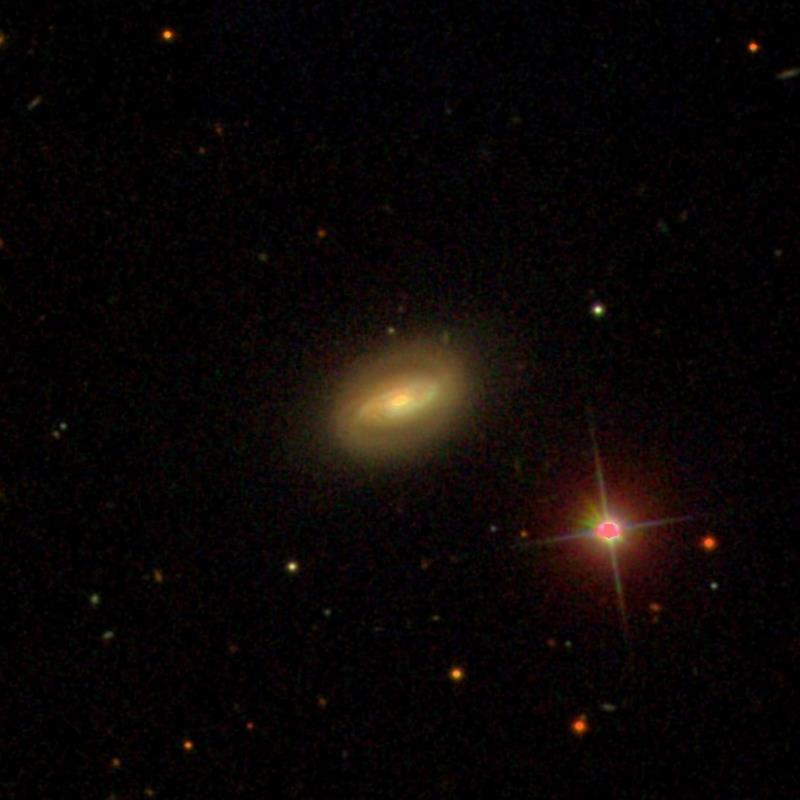
NGC 3 by SDSS

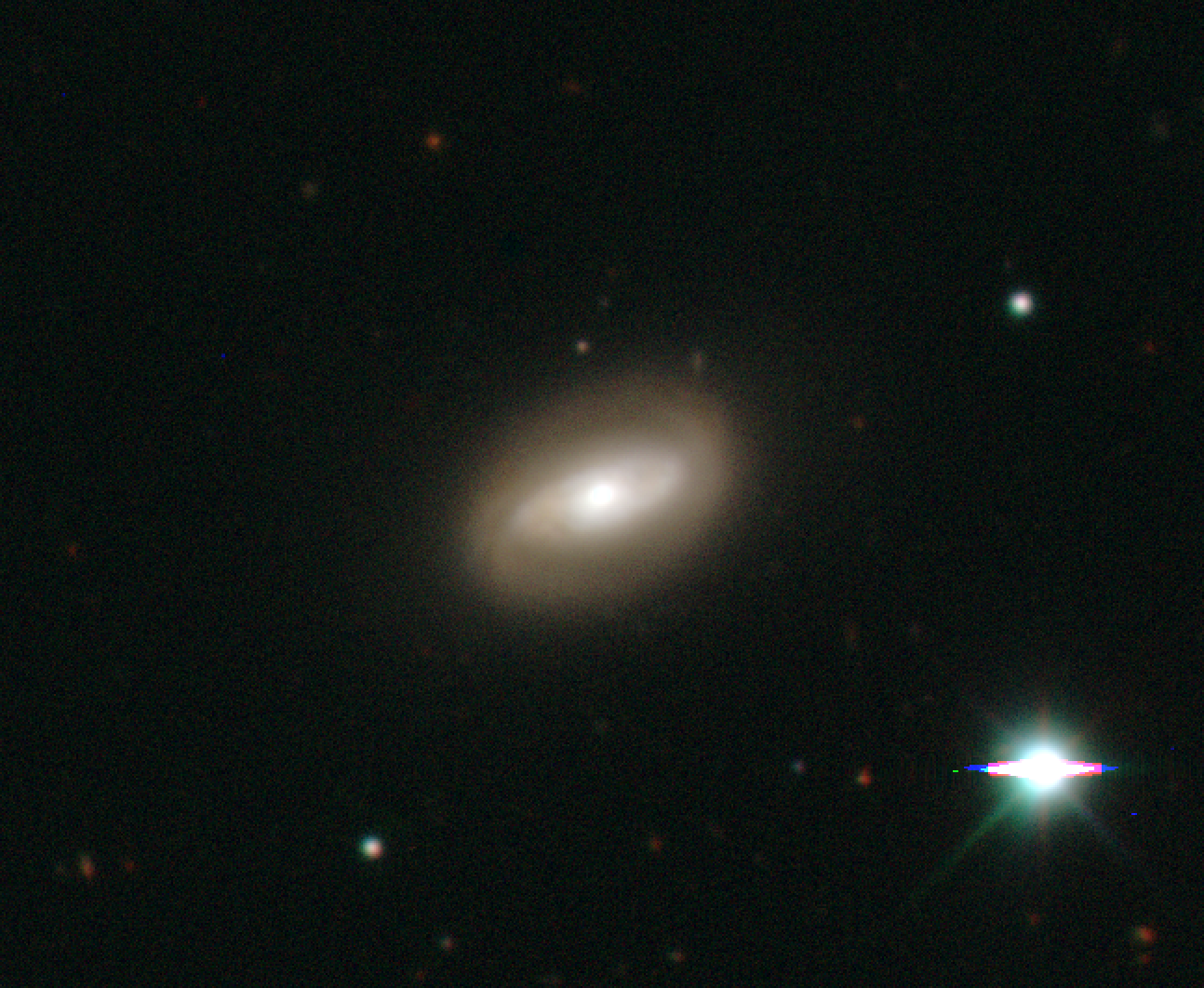
NGC 3 by DECam
