= Albert Marth =

German astronomer

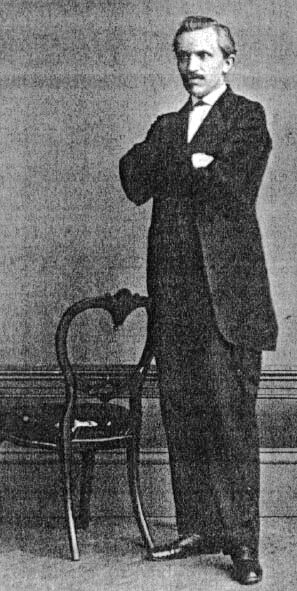
Albert Marth

Albert Marth (5 May 1828 – 6 August 1897) was a German astronomer who worked in Britain and Ireland.

== Life ==
After studying theology at the University of Berlin, his interest in astronomy and mathematics led him to study astronomy under C. A. F. Peters at the University of Königsberg.

Marth went to England in 1853 to work for George Bishop, a rich wine merchant and patron of astronomy, who financed a London observatory (in operation from 1836 to 1861). At that time, paid jobs in astronomy were quite rare.

He worked as William Lassell's assistant in Malta, discovering 600 nebulae. He also discovered one of the early asteroids found, 29 Amphitrite, and the galaxies NGC 3, NGC 4 and NGC 15.

He also investigated double stars, discovering NGC 30 in 1864.

From 1883 to 1897 he worked at the Markree Observatory in County Sligo where he was the second director appointed in its second period of operation.

He made extensive ephemerides of Solar System bodies. He excelled in performing calculations of transits of various planets from other planets, predicting transits of Earth from Mars and many others.

Craters on the Moon and Mars are named for him. The crater Marth on the Moon is about 3 km in diameter.
