= IC 1689 =

Galaxy in the constellation Pisces

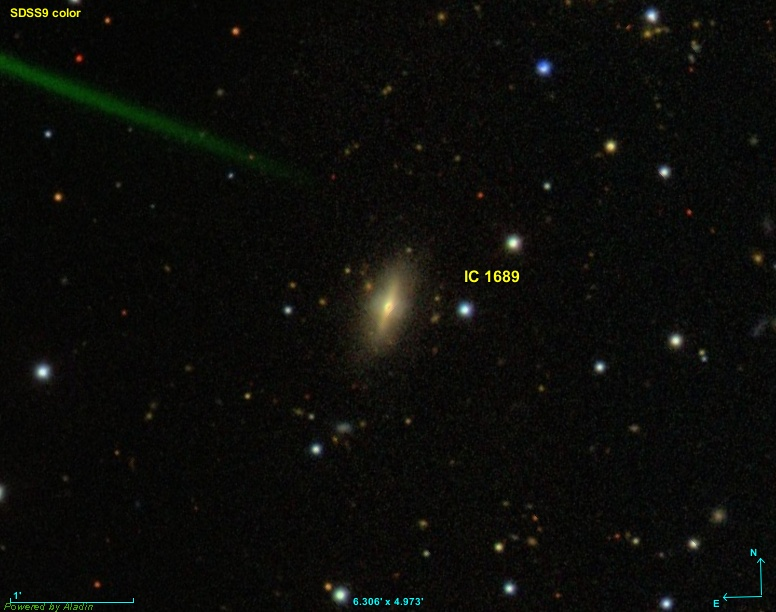
- SDSS image of IC 1689.

Observation data (J2000 epoch)
- Constellation: Pisces
- Right ascension: 01^{h} 23^{m} 47.87^{s}
- Declination: +33° 03′ 19.16″
- Redshift: 0.015231
- Heliocentric radial velocity: 4,566 km/s ± 7
- Distance: 215 Mly (65.97 Mpc)
- Apparent magnitude (V): 13.8

Characteristics
- Type: S0? LINER
- Size: ~70,800 ly (21.72 kpc) (estimated)

Other designations
- AGC 110989, 2MASX J01234783+3303192, CGCG 502-070, PGC 5108, MCG +05-04-046, NSA 129371, PRC B-03, WBL 038-017

IC 1689 is a lenticular galaxy located in the constellation of Pisces. The redshift of the galaxy is (z) 0.015 and it was first discovered by the French astronomer named Stephane Javelle in December 1899, who described it as a faint object with a bright central nucleus. This galaxy has also been described as a polar ring galaxy.

== Description ==
IC 1689 is categorized as a normal lenticular galaxy with a type S0 morphology. The galaxy has a peculiar appearance, with a clumpy structure that is located on its outer regions. The ring structure of the galaxy is, however, found to be small, while the central region is depicted to have a boxy-like appearance. The disk of the galaxy is also wrapped with the position angles somehow shifted by about 11°. The ring is symmetrical, while the surface brightness decreases at a steep side on the inner border and at a flat side on the outer border. The inner ring has a radius of about 1.2 kiloparsecs, while the outer ring is about 3.2 kiloparsecs.

A study published in 1996, has found IC 1689 contains an active central nucleus displaying low ionization spectral line emission that is extended from it. As the gas from its disk is weakly accreted into its nucleus, the galaxy is said to be classified as a LINER galaxy. Further evidence also finds the star formation only occurs in the outer regions of the disk. Hydrogen-alpha emission is present, mainly being concentrated in at least two regions, with ionized nitrogen emission detected inside the central region, indicating there is a rotating gaseous disk in a plane perpendicular to the galaxy's main plane. A magnesium line has also been detected, located in both the nucleus region and the radius region by 5.5 arcseconds where the ring feature is crossing the major axis.

IC 1689 is a member of the NGC 507 group. Known as LGG 26, the group comprises multiple galaxies, including NGC 507, IC 1687, IC 1690, NGC 501, NGC 512, NGC 528, NGC 523, NGC 483, NGC 536, NGC 587, NGC 591, Markarian 980, NGC 608, NGC 531, NGC 542, UGC 937, UGC 987, PGC 5100 and IC 1666.
