= IC 51 =

Polar ring galaxy in the constellation Cetus

- IC 51 seen by Hubble Space Telescope

Observation data (J2000 epoch)
- Constellation: Cetus
- Right ascension: 00^{h} 46^{m} 24.2322^{s}
- Declination: −13° 26′ 32.067″
- Redshift: 0.005764
- Heliocentric radial velocity: 1720.3 km/s
- Galactocentric velocity: 1757 ± 6 km/s
- Distance: 20.80 ± 1.49 Megaparsecs
- Apparent magnitude (B): 13.41
- Absolute magnitude (B): -18.22 ± 0.843
- Surface brightness: 23.63
- Magnitude (J): 11.256
- Magnitude (H): 10.614
- Magnitude (K): 10.251

Characteristics
- Type: S0 pec?
- Size: 9.90 kiloparsecs
- Half-light radius (physical): 1.08 kiloparsecs
- Half-light radius (apparent): 11.43 arcseconds

Other designations
- Arp 230, MCG -02-03-011, MC 0043-137, PGC 2710, PRC B-1, APG 230

IC 51 is a polar-ring galaxy located in the constellation Cetus. John Louis Emil Dreyer noted it as pretty bright, small, brighter middle, mottled but not resolved. IC 51 is listed in Halton Arp's ATLAS OF PECULIAR GALAXIES as Arp 230.

== Properties ==
Hydrodynamical simulations estimate IC 51 has an initial gas fraction of 0.50 ± 0.17 and a starburst mass fraction of 0.43 ± 0.15. Based on Spitzer Space Telescope's data, IC 51 has an axis ratio of 0.815, a stellar mass of 2.71 × 10⁹ solar masses and a star formation rate of 0.28 M⊙ yr^{-1}. A 2MASS survey found that IC 51's mid-infrared and far-infrared is dominated by star-formation, while the National Radio Astronomy Observatory (NRAO) Very Large Array (VLA) Sky Survey (NVSS) found IC 51 emits 25.3 mJy in 1.4 GHz wavelength.

Using the Spitzer Space Telescope's Infrared Array Camera (IRAC), IC 51 was found to exhibit a pseudo-bulge. Cosmicflows-4 survey revealed IC 51 to have a total dynamical mass 3.69 ×10^{11} M⊙. The Five-hundred-meter Aperture Spherical Telescope (FAST) detected 22.62 ± 3.58 Jy km s^{-1} of integrated neutral atomic hydrogen (H I) and a H I gas mass of 3.16 × 10^{9} M⊙. In the Spitzer Survey of Stellar Structure in Galaxies (S^{4}G), IC 51 has an elongated outer envelope (Ell = 0.327) and a half-light radius of 11.43 arcseconds.

The Large Millimeter Telescope only placed an upper limit on IC 51 for molecule detection like HCO^{+}(1-0), HCN(1-0) and ^{13}CO(1-0), confirming it is not a luminous infrared galaxy. IC 51 has a total infrared luminosity of 4.37 × 10^{9} L⊙ and a far-infrared luminosity of 3.72 × 10^{9} L⊙. In another survey, IC 51 has an isophotal shape parameter of 9.68 and a stellar mass of 8.13 × 10^{9} M⊙.

== Shells and Active galactic nucleus ==
The Transiting Exoplanet Survey Satellite found IC 51's supermassive black hole has a mass of 2.51 × 10⁷ M⊙ and was shown to not host an active galactic nucleus.

IC 51 has 6 shells and 3 streams. Optical images reveal that IC 51 has a bright, aligned interleaved shell system, caused by a radial encounter with a smaller companion. The H I gas in IC 51 is anti-correlated and unevenly distributed. Although the H I gas in IC 51 is unevenly distributed, the gas kinematics are similar to regular galaxies. IC 51 has an estimated star formation rate of 4 M⊙ yr^{-1} and a gas consumption time of 1 billion years. Research reveal two distinct gas components, a dense inner disk and a large outer disk. Researchers found IC 51 to be similar to Centaurus A.

== Environment ==
IC 51 is not in a galaxy group. While in another survey, IC 51 is found to be in HDC 30, which consists of 3 members, namely NGC 210 and NGC 178. In the 50 Mpc Galaxy Catalog (50 MGC), IC 51 is found to be in a galaxy group known as Group 213. It consists of 4 members, namely NGC 210, NGC 178 and NGC 255. IC 51 is part of a void (SSRS2 void 11), with the nearest galaxies to be 0.6 Mpc away and no nearby dwarf companions.

== See Also ==
- IC 1689
- IC 1459
- IC 3370
