= NGC 503 =

Galaxy in the constellation Pisces

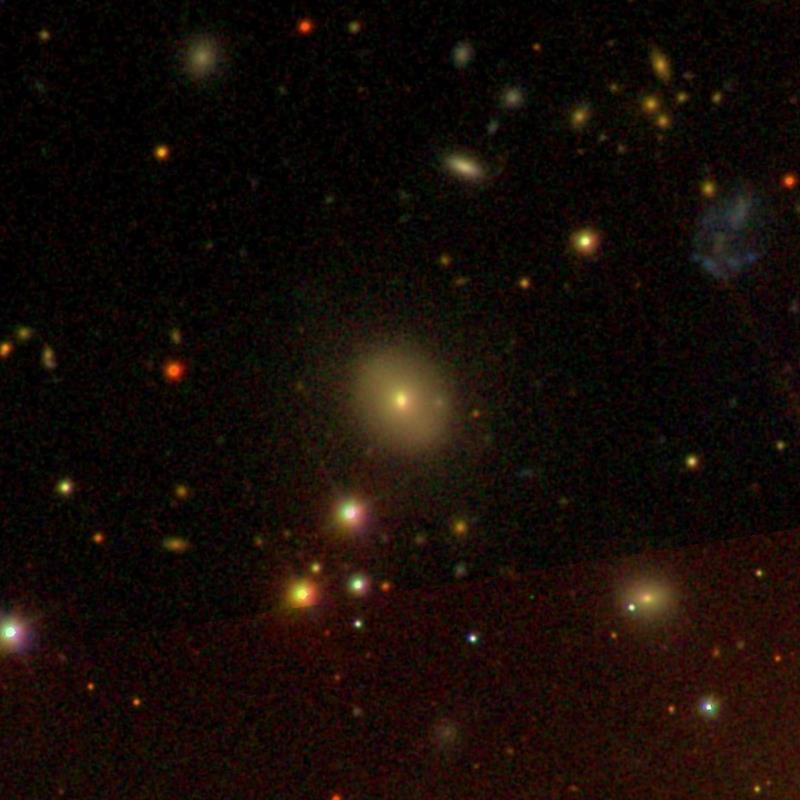
- SDSS view of NGC 503

Observation data (J2000 epoch)
- Constellation: Pisces
- Right ascension: 01^{h} 23^{m} 28.4^{s}
- Declination: +33° 19′ 54″
- Redshift: 0.01975 ± 0.00007
- Heliocentric radial velocity: (5862 ± 21) km/s
- Distance: 265 Mly
- Apparent magnitude (V): 14.1
- Apparent magnitude (B): 15.1

Characteristics
- Type: E-S0
- Apparent size (V): 0.9' × 0.7'

Other designations
- PGC 5086, GC 5169, MGC +05-04-040, 2MASS J01232845+3319542

NGC 503, also occasionally referred to as PGC 5086 or GC 5169, is an elliptical galaxy in the constellation Pisces. It is located approximately 265 million light-years from the Solar System and was discovered on 13 August 1863 by German astronomer Heinrich Louis d'Arrest.

== Observation history ==
Arrest discovered NGC 503 using an 11" reflecting telescope in Copenhagen. His position matches perfectly with PGC 5086. At the time of discovery, he considered the possibility of having observed one of William Herschels discoveries (NGC 495, 496, 499). John Louis Emil Dreyer, creator of the New General Catalogue, described the galaxy as "extremely faint, extremely small" with a "double star 4 arcmin to southwest".

== See also ==
- Elliptical galaxy
- List of NGC objects (1–1000)
- Pisces (constellation)
