= NGC 7030 =

Galaxy in the constellation Capricornus

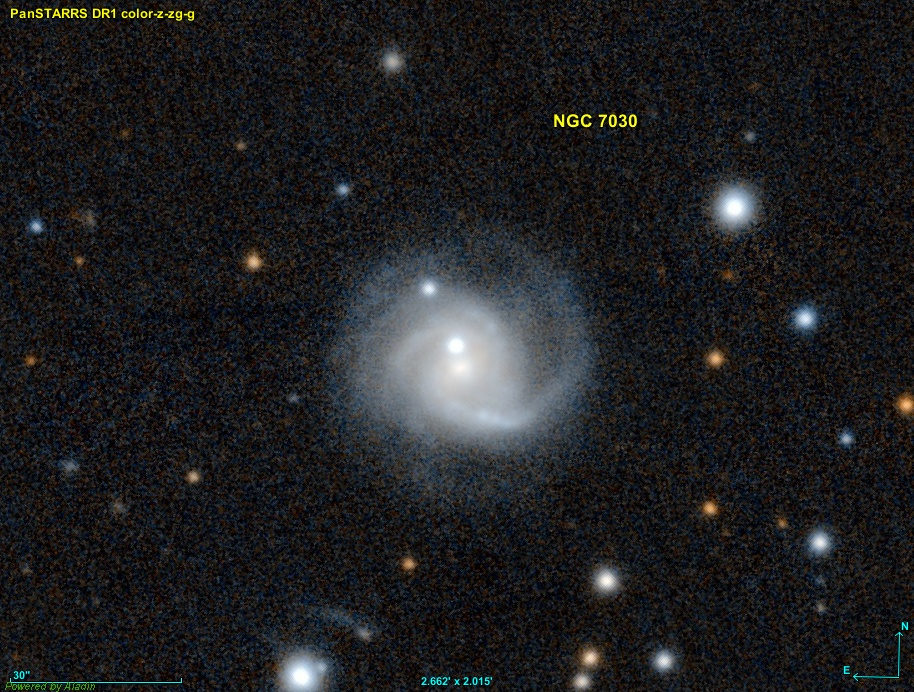
- The galaxy NGC 7030.

Observation data (J2000 epoch)
- Constellation: Capricornus
- Right ascension: 21^{h} 11^{m} 13.3^{s}
- Declination: −20° 29′ 09″
- Redshift: 0.029507
- Heliocentric radial velocity: 8,846 km/s
- Distance: 381.7 Mly
- Apparent magnitude (V): 14.50

Characteristics
- Type: (R')SB(r)ab pec
- Size: ~ 133,513.66 ly (estimated)
- Apparent size (V): 0.9 x 0.7

Other designations
- ESO 598-28, IRAS 21083-2041, MCG -4-50-3, PGC 66283

NGC 7030 is a barred spiral galaxy located about 380 million light-years away in the constellation Capricornus. NGC 7030 has an estimated diameter of 133,510 light-years. NGC 7030 was discovered by astronomer Francis Preserved Leavenworth on September 3, 1885.

== See also ==
- NGC 487
- NGC 53
- List of NGC objects (7001–7840)
