= NGC 508 =

Galaxy in the constellation Pisces

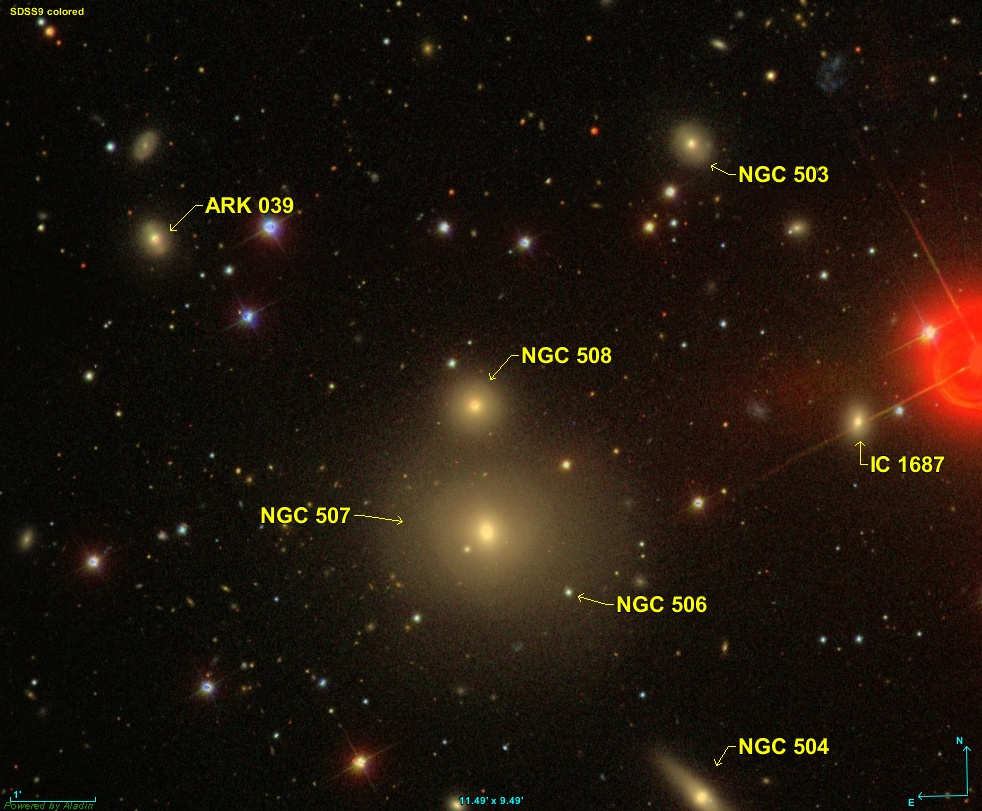
- SDSS view of NGC 508

Observation data (J2000 epoch)
- Constellation: Pisces
- Right ascension: 01^{h} 23^{m} 40.6^{s}
- Declination: +33° 16′ 49″
- Redshift: 0.01835 ± 0.00007
- Heliocentric radial velocity: (5451 ± 21) km/s
- Distance: 247 Mly
- Apparent magnitude (V): 13.1
- Apparent magnitude (B): 14.1

Characteristics
- Type: E
- Apparent size (V): 1.1' × 1.1'

Other designations
- PGC 5099, UGC 939, GC 295, MGC +05-04-045, 2MASS J01234058+3316502

NGC 508, also occasionally referred to as PGC 5099 or UGC 939, is an elliptical galaxy in the constellation Pisces. It is located approximately 247 million light-years from the Solar System and was discovered on 12 September 1784 by British astronomer William Herschel.

== Observation history ==
Herschel discovered NGC 508 along with NGC 507 and described the objects as "Two. Both eF, S, but unequal.". His observed position was catalogued and is accurate. John Louis Emil Dreyer, creator of the New General Catalogue, described the galaxy as "very faint, small, northern of two", with the other object being NGC 507.

== Description ==
The galaxy has an apparent size of 1.1 × 1.1 arcmins and a recessional velocity of 5525 kilometers per second. It is thought to be a group member with NGC 507, but as there is no evidence of interaction between the objects, the two are not necessarily a physical pair. Although NGC 508 is usually treated as part of Arp 229, the description of the Arp-galaxy only applies to the larger NGC 507. Therefore, the term Arp 229 should only be used as an alternative designation for NGC 507.

== See also ==
- Elliptical galaxy
- List of NGC objects (1–1000)
- Pisces (constellation)
