= NGC 513 =

Galaxy in the constellation Andromeda

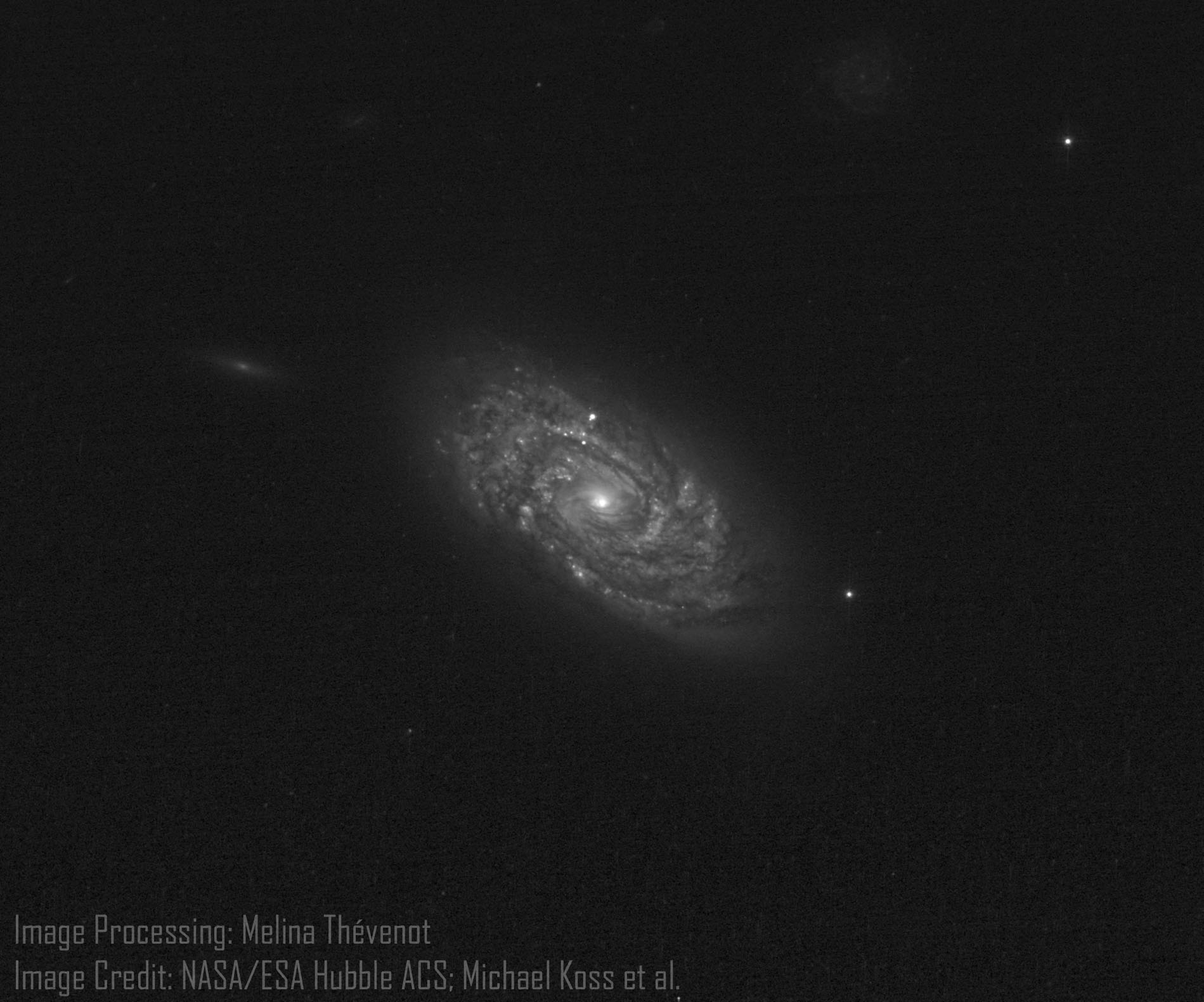
- NGC 513 (NASA/ESA HST)

Observation data (J2000 epoch)
- Constellation: Andromeda
- Right ascension: 01^{h} 24^{m} 26.8^{s}
- Declination: +33° 47′ 58″
- Redshift: 0.019560 ± 0.000357
- Heliocentric radial velocity: (5807 ± 107) km/s
- Distance: 262 Mly
- Apparent magnitude (V): 12.9
- Apparent magnitude (B): 13.6

Characteristics
- Type: Sc
- Apparent size (V): 0.9' × 0.6'

Other designations
- PGC 5174, UGC 953, GC 297, MCG +06-04-016, 2MASS J01242680+3347585, IRAS F01216+3332

NGC 513, also occasionally referred to as PGC 5174 or UGC 953, is a spiral galaxy in the constellation Andromeda. It is located approximately 262 million light-years from the Solar System and was discovered by German-British astronomer William Herschel on 13 September 1784.

== Observation history ==
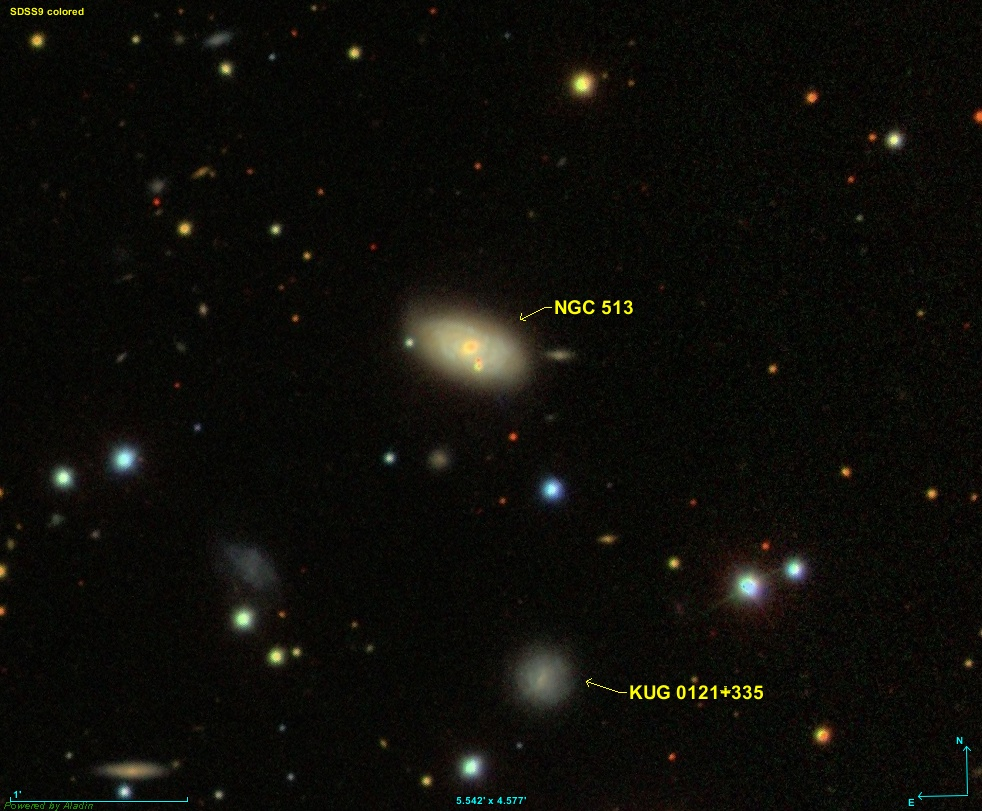
SDSS view of NGC 513

Herschel discovered the object and simply noted "stellar". Therefore, the galaxy was probably mistaken for a star. Herschel discovered this galaxy along with many other objects on a single observation, using Beta Andromedae as a reference star. The position noted is correct and off only by approximately 30" from UGC 953, thus the objects are generally viewed as equivalents. John Louis Emil Dreyer, creator of the New General Catalogue, described the galaxy as "faint, small, stellar", still indicating the misidentification of NGC 513 as a star.

== Description ==
The galaxy has an apparent size of 0.9 × 0.6 arcmins and a recessional velocity of approximately 5807 kilometers per second. The redshift of 0.01956 allows an estimate of the galaxy's distance using Hubble's law, which puts the object at roughly 260 million light-years from the Sun.

== Supernova ==
One supernova has been observed in NGC 513:

- SN 2023jpp (Type Ia, mag. 17.6) was discovered by the Zwicky Transient Facility on 28 May 2023.

== See also ==
- List of NGC objects (1–1000)
