= NGC 504 =

Galaxy in the constellation Pisces

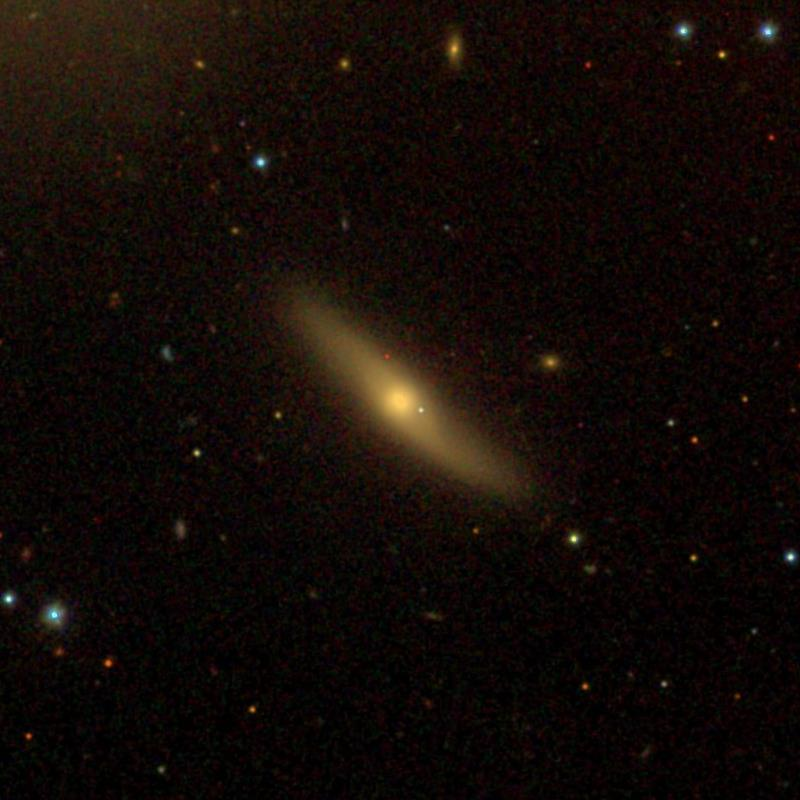
- SDSS view of NGC 504

Observation data (J2000 epoch)
- Constellation: Pisces
- Right ascension: 01^{h} 23^{m} 27.9^{s}
- Declination: +33° 12′ 16″
- Redshift: 0.014096 ± 0.000270
- Heliocentric radial velocity: (4196 ± 81) km/s
- Distance: 189 Mly
- Apparent magnitude (V): 13.0
- Apparent magnitude (B): 14.0

Characteristics
- Type: S0
- Apparent size (V): 1.7' × 0.4'

Other designations
- PGC 5084, UGC 935, GC 291, GC 292, MGC +05-04-041, 2MASS J01232787+3312152, h 107

NGC 504, also occasionally referred to as PGC 5084 or UGC 935, is a lenticular galaxy located approximately 189 million light-years from the Solar System in the constellation Pisces. It was discovered on 22 November 1827 by astronomer John Herschel. The object was listed twice in the General Catalogue, precursor of the New General Catalogue, as both GC 291 and GC 292.

NGC 504 is part of a galaxy group known as NGC 499 Group or LGG 24. It has at least 6 members, which are NGC 495, NGC 517, NGC 499, NGC 582 and PGC 5026.

== Observation history ==
Herschel discovered the object without recording a visual description. However, he noted the nebula "precedes NGC 507 by about 10 seconds and is half a field to the south of it". NGC 504 was later also independently discovered by Heinrich d'Arrest, using an 11" reflecting telescope in Copenhagen and assuming the object was new. This led to Herschel cataloguing the two observations separately as GC 291 and GC 292. The objects were later combined by John Louis Emil Dreyer with the creation of the New General Catalogue, in which the galaxy was described as "very faint, small".

== See also ==
- Lenticular galaxy
- List of NGC objects (1–1000)
- Pisces (constellation)
