= NGC 511 =

Galaxy in the constellation Pisces

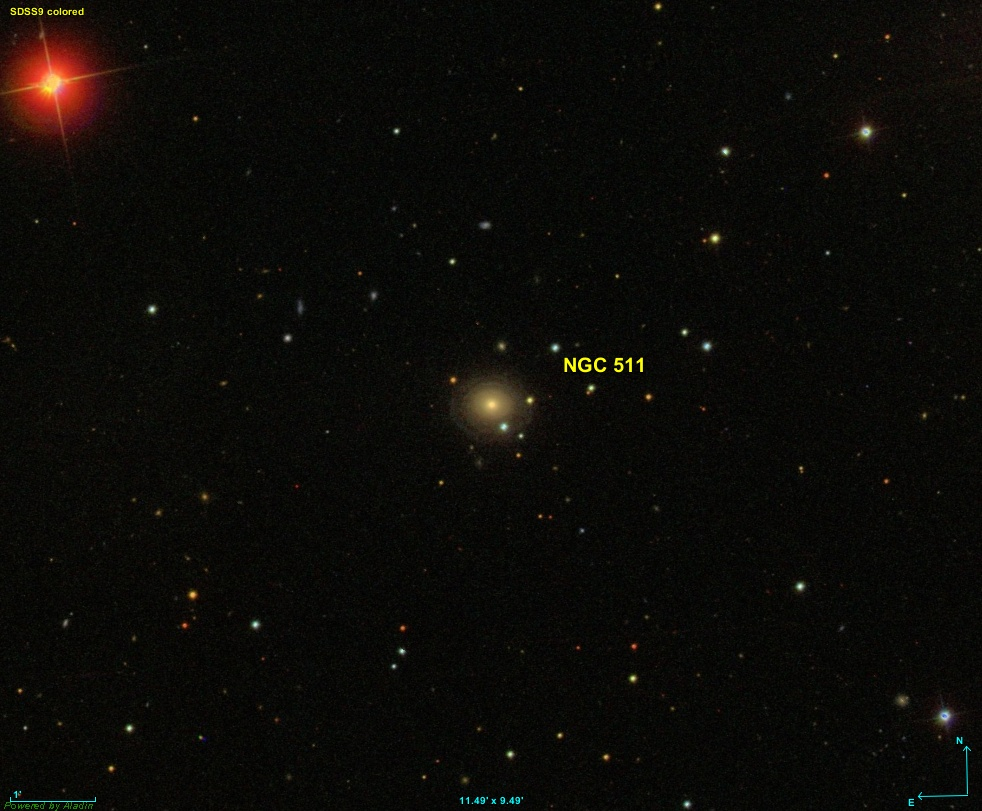
- SDSS view of NGC 511

Observation data (J2000 epoch)
- Constellation: Pisces
- Right ascension: 01^{h} 23^{m} 30.7^{s}
- Declination: +11° 17′ 28″
- Redshift: 0.03723 ± 0.00015
- Heliocentric radial velocity: (10954 ± 44) km/s
- Distance: 499 Mly
- Apparent magnitude (V): 13.9
- Apparent magnitude (B): 14.9

Characteristics
- Type: E
- Apparent size (V): 1.1' × 1.1'

Other designations
- PGC 5103, UGC 936, GC 5174, MGC +02-04-033, 2MASS J01233074+1117274

NGC 511, also occasionally referred to as PGC 5103 or UGC 936, is an elliptical galaxy in the constellation Pisces. It is located approximately 499 million light-years from the Solar System and was discovered on 26 October 1876 by French astronomer Édouard Stephan.

== Observation history ==
Stephan discovered the object with the 31" silver-glass reflecting telescope at the Marseille Observatory. He described his discovery as diffuse, with two faint stars on the west side. The description and position given in his notes matches UGC 936 and PGC 5103, thus the objects are widely recognized as the same. John Louis Emil Dreyer, creator of the New General Catalogue, described the galaxy as "extremely faint, very small, small (faint) star involved, small star attached", with the two stars being the objects to the west of NGC 511.

== Description ==
The galaxy has an apparent size of 1.1 × 1.1 arcmins and a recessional velocity of approximately 10954 kilometers per second. It also contains multiple concentric rings. The distance of NGC 511 from the Solar System can be estimated using Hubble's law, which puts the object at nearly 500 million light-years from the Sun.

== See also ==
- Elliptical galaxy
- List of NGC objects (1–1000)
- Pisces (constellation)
