= General catalogue =

There are two astronomical General Catalogues:

- Boss General Catalogue, an astronomical catalogue compiled by Benjamin Boss and published in the U.S. in 1936
- General Catalogue of Nebulae and Clusters, an astronomical catalogue by John Herschel expanding on the work of his father William Herschel

== See also ==
- New General Catalogue
- Revised New General Catalogue
