= Nebulae and Star Clusters =

There are several astronomical catalogues referred to as Nebulae and Star Clusters.

A Nebula is a cloud of dust and gas inside a galaxy. Nebulae become visible if the gas glows, or if the cloud reflects starlight or obscures light from more distant objects.

The catalogues that it may refer to:

- Catalogue des nébuleuses et des amas d'étoiles (Messier "M" catalogue) first published 1771
- Catalogue of Nebulae and Clusters of Stars (William Herschel 'CN'/"H" catalogue) first published 1786
- General Catalogue of Nebulae and Clusters of Stars (John Herschel 'GC'/"h" catalogue) first published 1864
- New General Catalogue of Nebulae and Clusters of Stars (Dreyer "NGC" catalogue) first published 1888
  - Index Catalogue of Nebulae and Clusters of Stars (JLE Dreyer's "IC" catalogue)

== See also ==
- Nebula, a type of celestial body
- Galaxy, a type of celestial body formerly referred to as nebulae
- Star cluster or cluster of stars, a type of celestial body
