= NGC 3007 =

Galaxy in the constellation Sextans

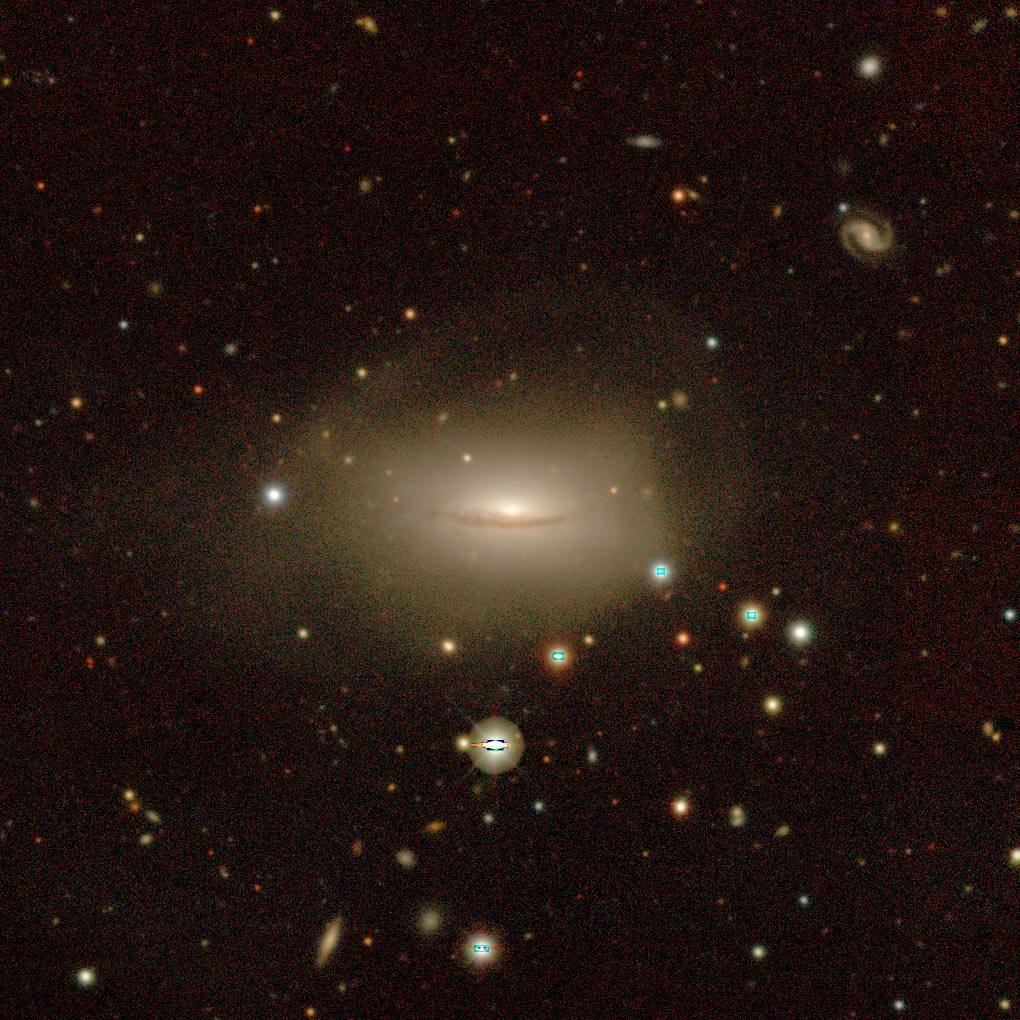
- legacy surveys image of NGC 3007

Observation data (J2000 epoch)
- Constellation: Sextans
- Right ascension: 09^{h} 47^{m} 45.620^{s}
- Declination: −06° 26′ 17.40″
- Redshift: 0.02175
- Heliocentric radial velocity: 6520 km/s
- Distance: 330.3 ± 23.2 Mly (101.27 ± 7.11 Mpc)
- Apparent magnitude (B): 14.41

Characteristics
- Type: S0/a

Other designations
- IRAS 09452-0612, MCG -01-25-038, PGC 28150

NGC 3007 is an edge-on, magnitude 13.4, lenticular galaxy in the constellation of Sextans, discovered by French astronomer Édouard Stephan on March 16, 1885. It is about 115 thousand light years across, and with a recessional velocity of 6,520 kilometers per second, is at a distance of over 300 million light-years from the Sun.

== See also ==
- List of NGC objects (3001–4000)
