= NGC 462 =

Elliptical galaxy in the constellation Pisces

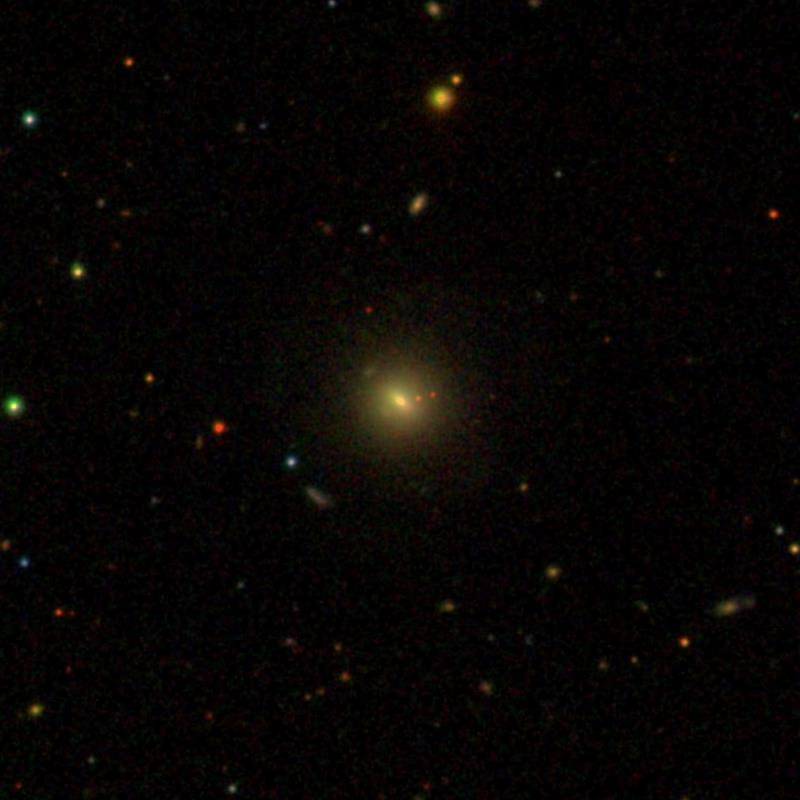
- NGC 462 as seen on SDSS

Observation data (J2000 epoch)
- Constellation: Pisces
- Right ascension: 01^{h} 18^{m} 10.9^{s}
- Declination: +04° 13′ 35″
- Redshift: 0.04650 ± 0.00010
- Heliocentric radial velocity: 13615 ± 29 km/s
- Distance: 623 Mly
- Apparent magnitude (V): 14,7

Characteristics
- Type: Elliptical
- Apparent size (V): 0,4' × 0,4'

Other designations
- PGC 4667, GC 5162, NPM1G +03.0047

NGC 462 is an elliptical galaxy located in the constellation Pisces. It was discovered by Albert Marth on 23 October 1864. Dreyer, creator of the New General Catalogue, originally described it as "extremely faint, very small, stellar". The word stellar clearly suggests an initial misidentification of NGC 462 as a star.

== See also ==
- Elliptical galaxy
- List of NGC objects (1–1000)
- Pisces (constellation)

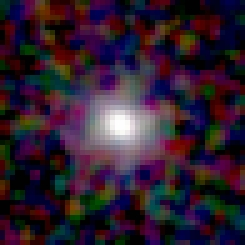
NGC 462 (2MASS)
