= NGC 494 =

Galaxy in the constellation Pisces

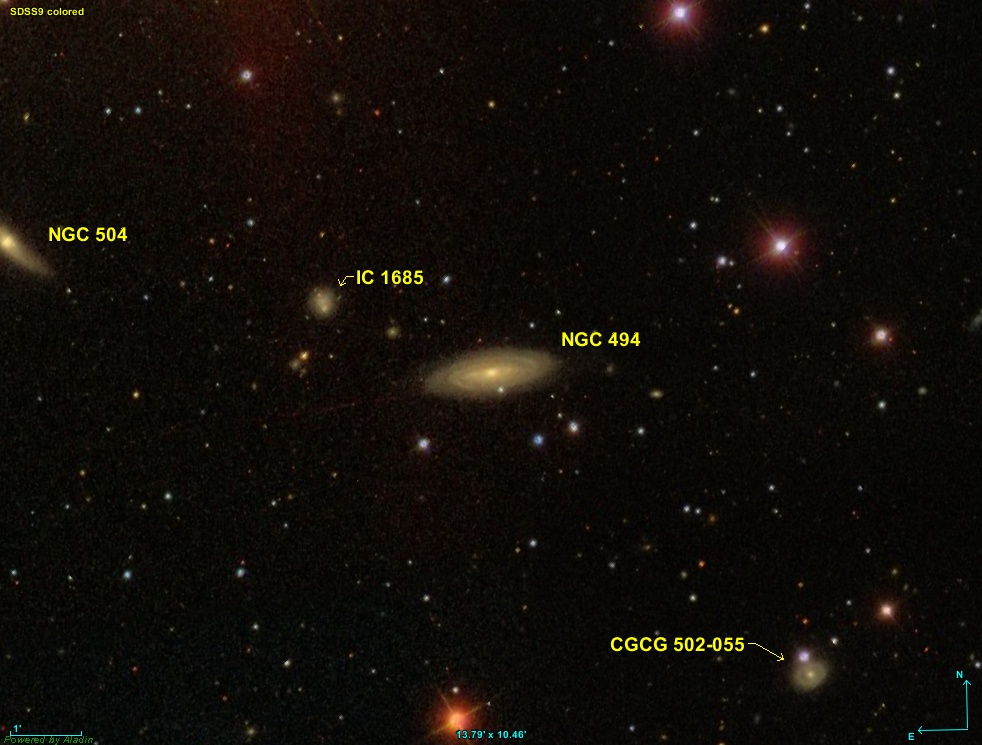
- SDSS view of NGC 494

Observation data (J2000 epoch)
- Constellation: Pisces (constellation)
- Right ascension: 01^{h} 22^{m} 55.36^{s}
- Declination: +33° 10′ 25.8″
- Redshift: 0.018388 ± 0.000067
- Heliocentric radial velocity: (5462 ± 20) km/s
- Distance: 227 Mly
- Apparent magnitude (V): 13.0

Characteristics
- Type: Sab?
- Apparent size (V): 2.0′ × 0.8′

Other designations
- PGC 5035, GC 282, UGC 919, 2MASS J01225533+3310261, Z 502.57, MGC +05-04-034, IRAS 01201+3254, h 104

NGC 494, also occasionally referred to as PGC 5035 or GC 282, is a barred spiral galaxy in the constellation Pisces. It is located approximately 227 million light-years from Earth and was discovered on 22 November 1827 by astronomer John Herschel. John Dreyer, creator of the New General Catalogue, described the galaxy as "very faint, pretty large, extended, 3 faint stars to south".

== See also ==
- Spiral galaxy
- List of NGC objects (1–1000)
- Pisces (constellation)
