= NGC 561 =

Galaxy in the constellation Andromeda

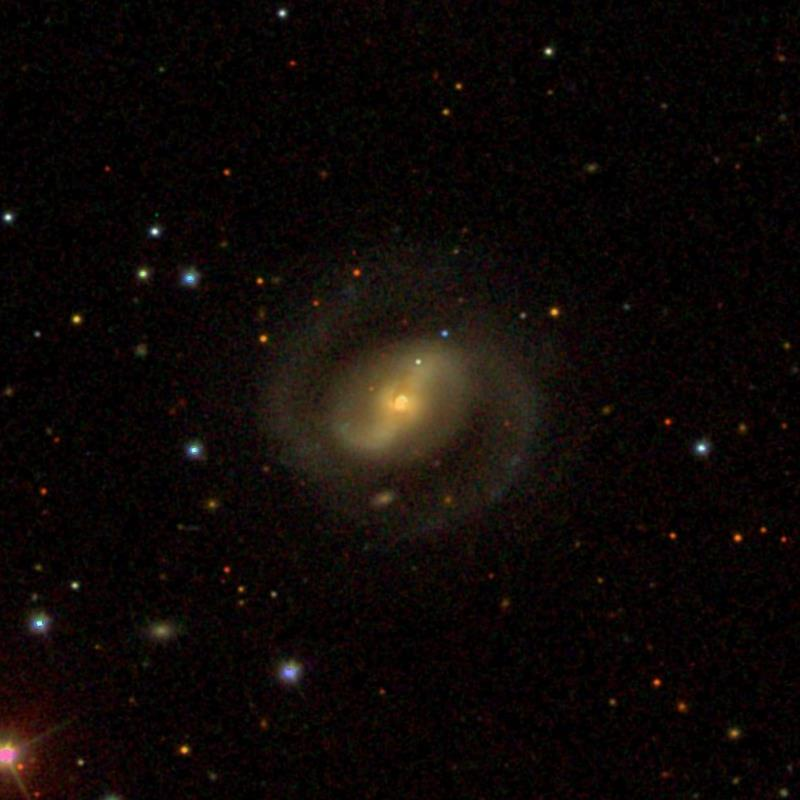

Observation data (J2000 epoch)
- Constellation: Andromeda
- Right ascension: 01^{h} 28^{m} 18^{s}
- Declination: 01° 28′ 18″
- Redshift: 0.015758
- Heliocentric radial velocity: 4687 ± 4 km/s
- Apparent magnitude (B): 14.1
- Surface brightness: 23.44 mag/arcsec^{2}

Characteristics
- Type: (R)SB(s)a

Other designations
- UGC 1048, MCG +06-04-029, PGC 5489

NGC 561 is a barred spiral galaxy located in the constellation Andromeda. Its speed relative to the cosmic microwave background is 4,395 ± 20 km/s, which corresponds to a Hubble distance of 64.8 ± 4.6 Mpc (~211 million ly). NGC 561 was discovered by Prussian astronomer Heinrich d'Arrest in 1862.

The luminosity class of NGC 561 is I and it has a broad HI1 line.

NGC 561 is part of the NGC 507 group. This vast group includes at least 42 galaxies, 21 of which appear in the NGC catalog and 5 in the IC catalog. Four members of this group are also Markarian galaxies. The brightest of these galaxies is NGC 507 and the largest is NGC 536.

== See also ==
- List of NGC objects (1–1000)
- New General Catalogue
