= NGC 493 =

Galaxy in the constellation Cetus

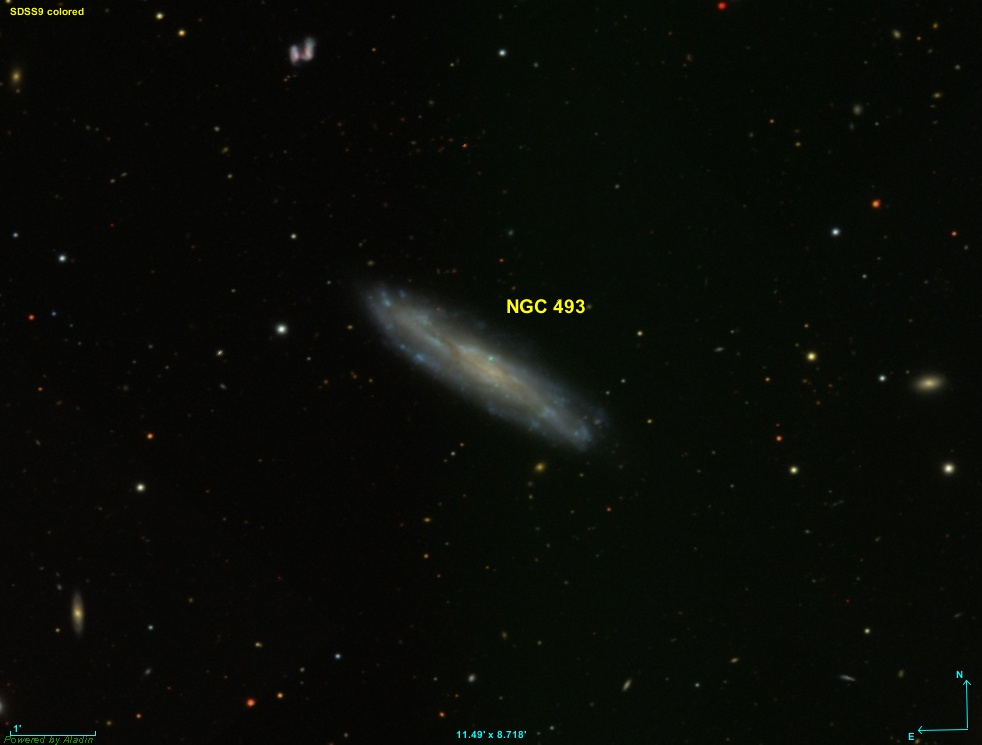
- SDSS view of NGC 493

Observation data (J2000 epoch)
- Constellation: Cetus
- Right ascension: 01^{h} 22^{m} 09.54^{s}
- Declination: +00° 56′ 47.5″
- Redshift: 0.007799 ± 0.000017
- Heliocentric radial velocity: (+2329 ± 5) km/s
- Distance: 90 Mly
- Apparent magnitude (V): 12.2

Characteristics
- Type: SAB(s)cd?
- Apparent size (V): 4.3′ × 1.7′

Other designations
- PGC 4979, GC 281, UGC 914, 2MASS J01220898+0056432, Z 385.84, MGC +00-04-099, IRAS 01195+0041, H 3.594, h 105

NGC 493, also occasionally referred to as PGC 4979 or GC 281, is a barred spiral galaxy in the constellation Cetus. It is located approximately 90 million light-years from Earth and was discovered on December 20, 1786 by astronomer William Herschel. It was later also observed by his son, John Herschel. John Dreyer, creator of the New General Catalogue, described the galaxy as "very faint, large, much extended 60°" with "a little brighter middle".

== Supernovae ==
Three supernovae have been observed in NGC 493:

- SN 1971S (type unknown, mag. 15.5) was discovered by Luisa Pigatto on 15 November 1971.
- SN 2016hgm (Type II, mag. 17.9) was discovered by Mirco Villi and the Catalina Real-time Transient Survey on 19 October 2016.
- SN 2022ywf (Type Ia-02cx, mag. 19.95) was discovered by the Zwicky Transient Facility on 28 October 2022.

== See also ==
- Spiral galaxy
- List of NGC objects (1–1000)
