= NGC 522 =

Galaxy in the constellation Pisces

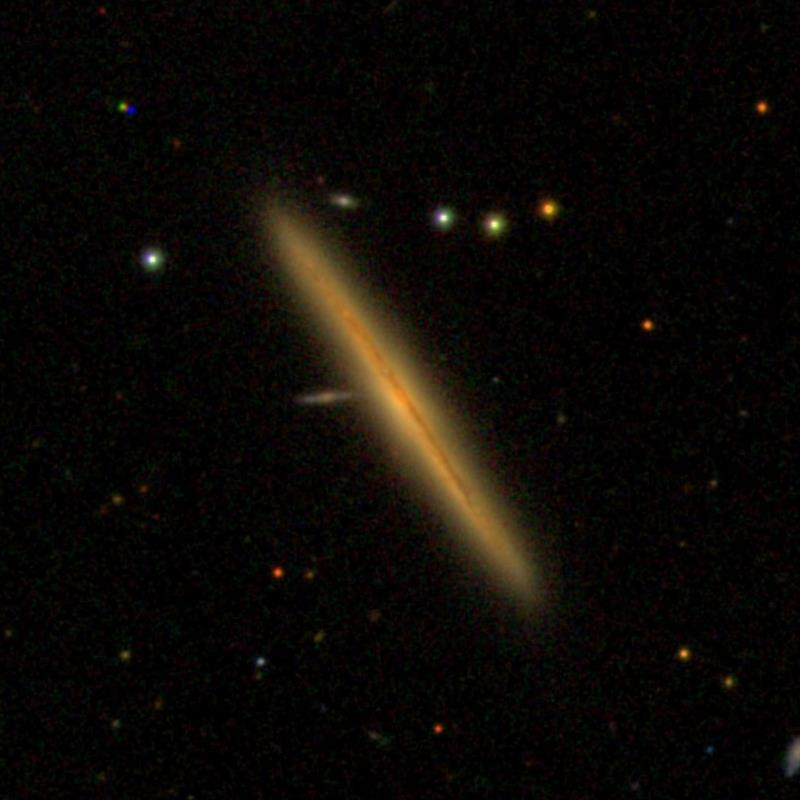
- NGC 522 as seen on SDSS

Observation data (J2000 epoch)
- Constellation: Pisces
- Right ascension: 01^{h} 24^{m} 45.9^{s}
- Declination: +09° 59′ 42″
- Redshift: (0.009256 ± 0.000160)
- Heliocentric radial velocity: (2762 ± 48) km/s
- Distance: 122 Mly
- Apparent magnitude (V): 13.2
- Apparent magnitude (B): 14.0

Characteristics
- Type: Sbc
- Apparent size (V): 2.8' × 0.5'

Other designations
- PGC 5218, UGC 970, GC 305, MGC +02-04-038, 2MASS J01244585+0959406, IRAS 01221+0944

NGC 522, also occasionally referred to as PGC 5218 or UGC 970, is a spiral galaxy located approximately 122 million light-years from the Solar System in the constellation Pisces. It was discovered on 25 September 1862 by astronomer Heinrich Louis d'Arrest.

== Observation history ==
D'Arrest discovered NGC 522 using his 11-inch refractor telescope at Copenhagen. He located the galaxy's position with a total of two observations. As the position matches both UGC 962 and PGC 5190, the objects are generally referred to as synonymous. NGC 522 was later catalogued by John Louis Emil Dreyer in the New General Catalogue, where the galaxy was described as "extremely faint, pretty large, irregular figure, perhaps cluster plus nebula".

== Description ==
The galaxy can be observed edge-on from Earth, thus appearing very elongated. It can be classified as spiral galaxy of type Sbc using the Hubble Sequence. The object's distance of roughly 120 million light-years from the Solar System can be estimated using its redshift and Hubble's law.

== See also ==
- Spiral galaxy
- List of NGC objects (1–1000)
- Pisces (constellation)

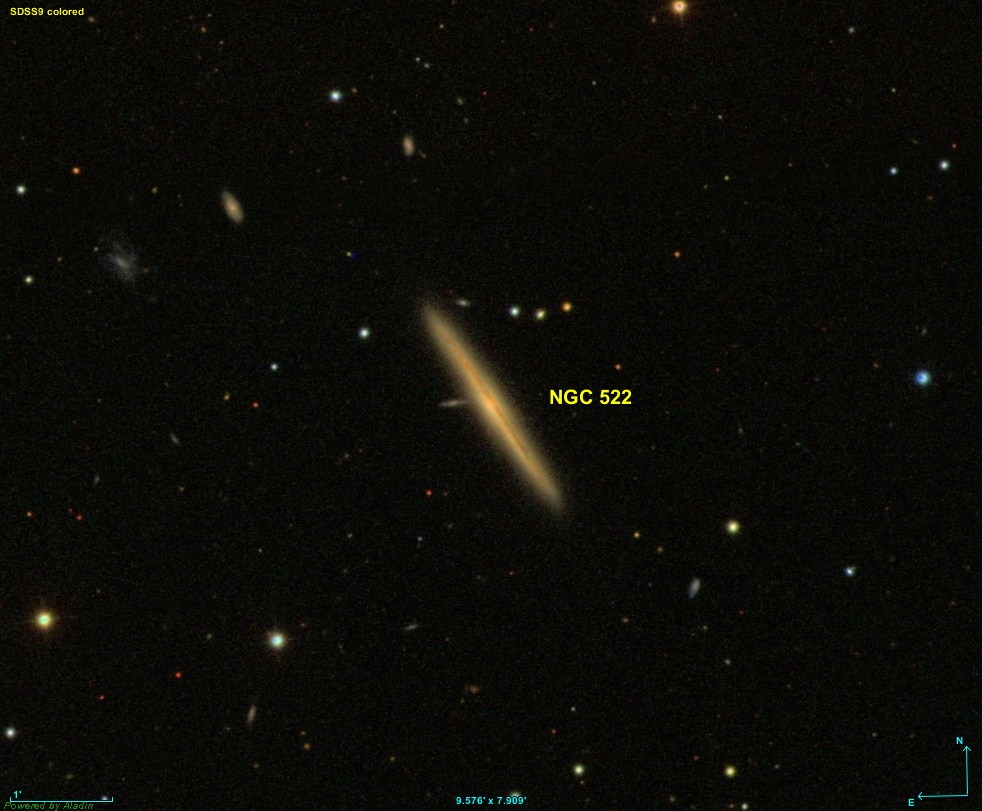
NGC 522 (SDSS)
