= NGC 1077 =

Galaxy in the constellation Perseus

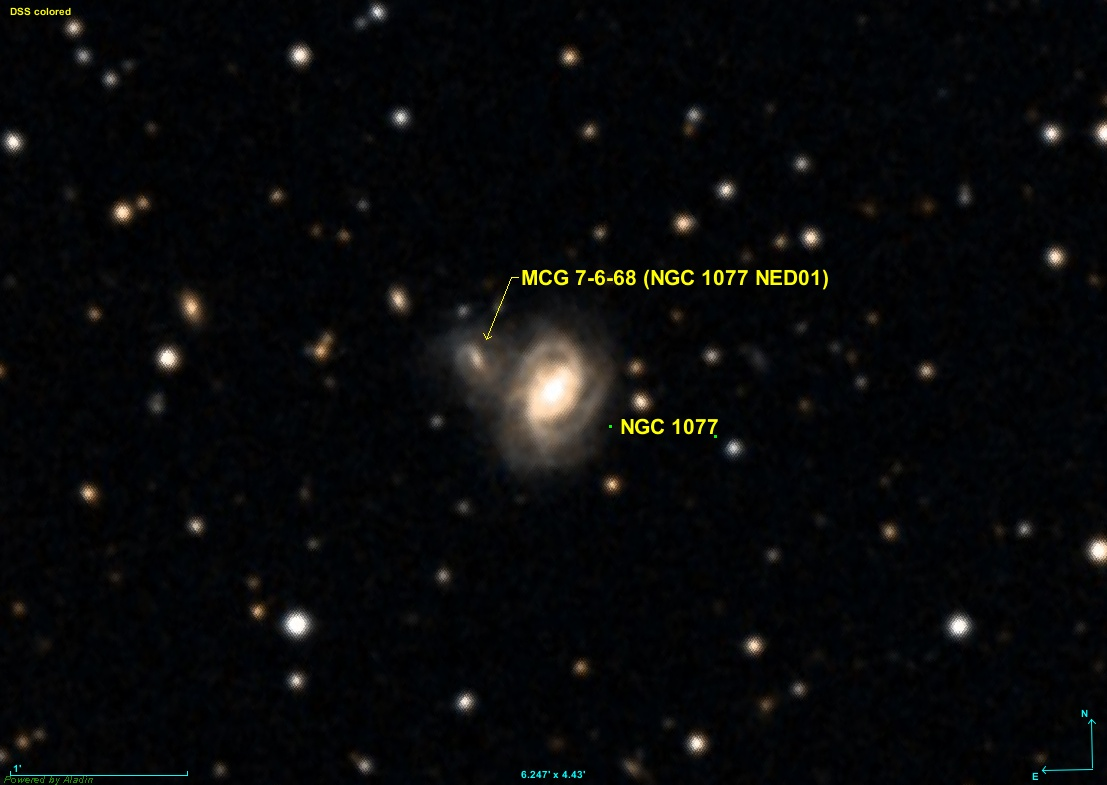
- DSS image of NGC 1077 (right) and NGC 1077B (left)

Observation data (J2000 epoch)
- Constellation: Perseus
- Right ascension: 02^{h} 46^{m} 00.570^{s}
- Declination: +40° 05′ 24.82″
- Redshift: 0.029900
- Heliocentric radial velocity: 8964 km/s
- Distance: 395.4 Mly (121.23 Mpc)
- Apparent magnitude (B): 14.6

Characteristics
- Type: Sb
- Apparent size (V): 0.973′ × 0.740′

Other designations
- UGC 2230, MGC+07-06-069, PGC 10468

NGC 1077 is a spiral galaxy in the constellation Perseus. It was discovered on 16 August 1886 by Lewis A. Swift. It was described as "very faint, pretty large, extended" by John Louis Emil Dreyer, the compiler of the New General Catalogue.

NGC 1077 is a galaxy pair with another galaxy appearing close to it. This galaxy, NGC 1077B, has a recessional velocity of 8529 km/s. This is similar to NGC 1077's recessional velocity of 8964 km/s, so they are assumed to be physically related.
