= NGC 517 =

Galaxy in the constellation Pisces

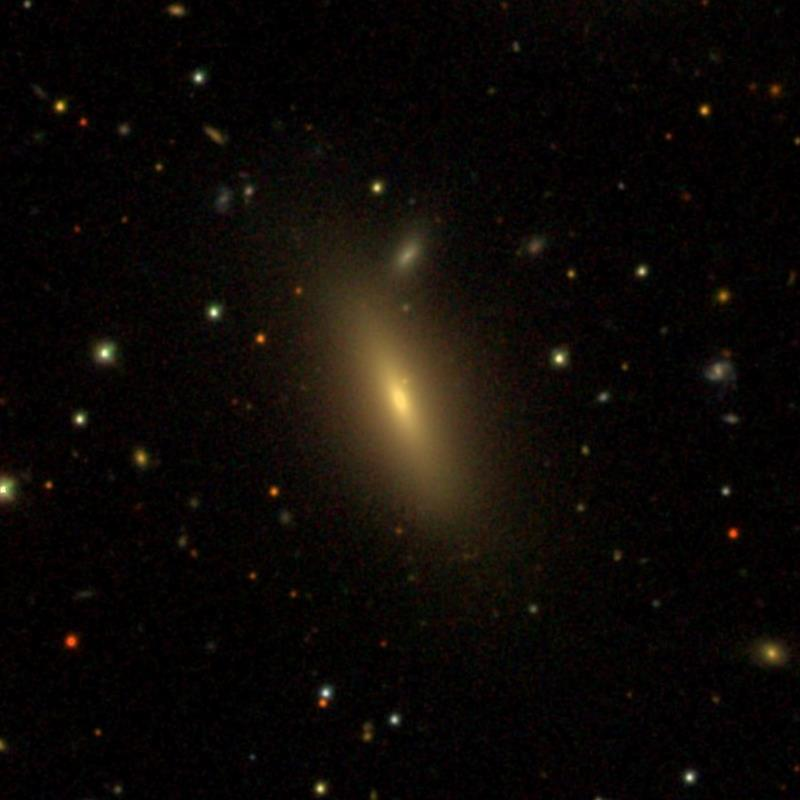
- NGC 517 and NGC 515 as seen on SDSS

Observation data (J2000 epoch)
- Constellation: Pisces
- Right ascension: 01^{h} 24^{m} 43.8^{s}
- Declination: +33° 25′ 46″
- Redshift: 0.014003 ± 0.000193
- Heliocentric radial velocity: (4169 ± 58) km/s
- Distance: 188 Mly
- Apparent magnitude (V): 12.5
- Apparent magnitude (B): 13.5

Characteristics
- Type: S0
- Apparent size (V): 1.4' × 0.5'

Other designations
- PGC 5214, UGC 960, GC 301, MGC +05-04-054, 2MASS J01244381+3325465, h 114

NGC 517, also occasionally referred to as PGC 5214 or UGC 960, is a lenticular galaxy located approximately 188 million light-years from the Solar System in the constellation Pisces. It was discovered on 13 September 1784 by astronomer William Herschel.

NGC 517 is part of a galaxy group known as NGC 499 Group or LGG 24. It has at least 6 members, which are NGC 495, NGC 499, NGC 504, NGC 582 and PGC 5026.

== Observation history ==
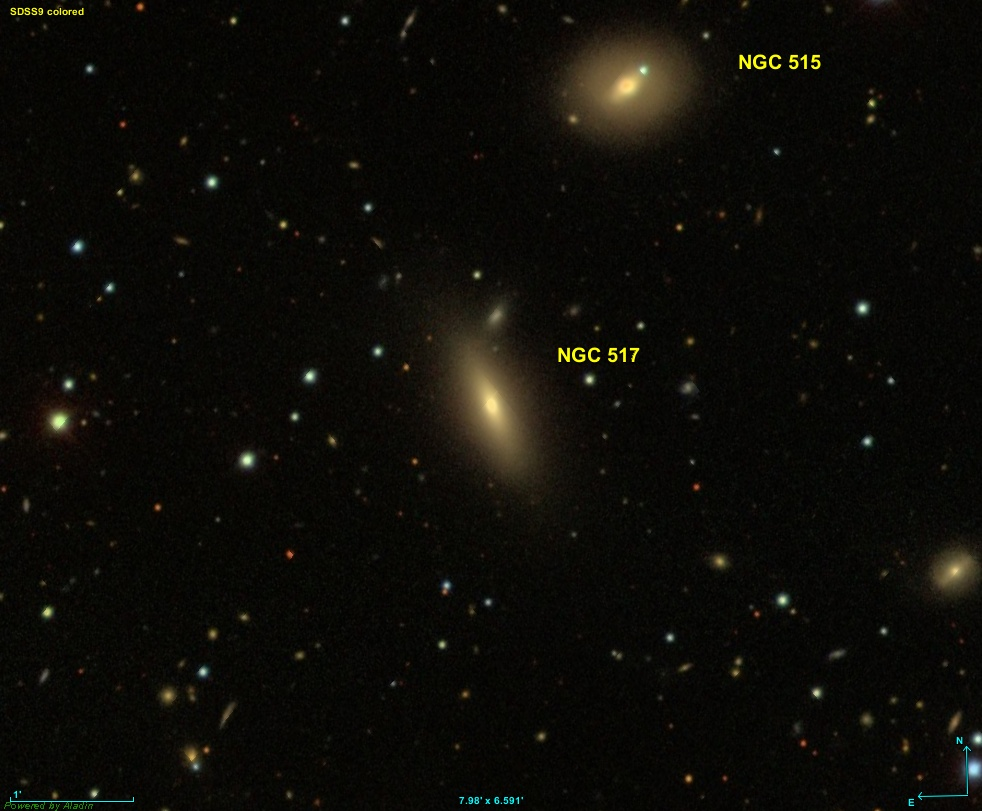
NGC 517 and NGC 515 (SDSS)

Herschel discovered the object along with NGC 515 using Beta Andromedae as a reference star. He described his discovery as "two, both stellar", indicating his misidentification of the object as a star. While Herschel only noted one position about 35" east of NGC 515, Heinrich d'Arrest made the first accurate measurement of the object, using observation data of three separate nights. The object was also observed by John Herschel, son of William Herschel and later catalogued by John Louis Emil Dreyer in the New General Catalogue, where the galaxy was described as "pretty faint, round, stellar, southeastern of 2" with the other one being NGC 515.

== Description ==
The galaxy has an apparent visual magnitude of 12.5 and can be classified as type S0 using the Hubble Sequence. The object's distance of roughly 190 million light-years from the Solar System can be estimated using its redshift and Hubble's law.

== See also ==
- Lenticular galaxy
- List of NGC objects (1–1000)
- Pisces (constellation)
