= NGC 515 =

Galaxy in the constellation Pisces

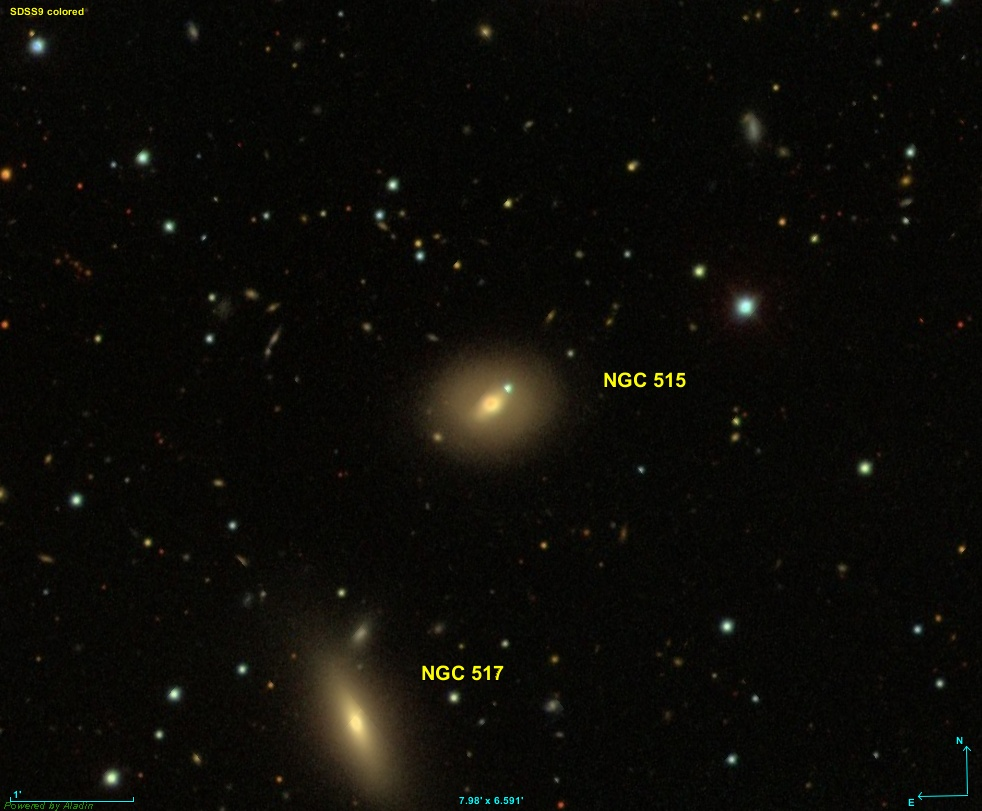
- NGC 515 and NGC 517 as seen on SDSS

Observation data (J2000 epoch)
- Constellation: Pisces
- Right ascension: 01^{h} 24^{m} 38.6^{s}
- Declination: +33° 28′ 22″
- Redshift: 0.01700 ± 0.00007
- Heliocentric radial velocity: (5053 ± 21) km/s
- Distance: 228 Mly
- Apparent magnitude (V): 13.1
- Apparent magnitude (B): 14.1

Characteristics
- Type: S0
- Apparent size (V): 1.4' × 1.1'

Other designations
- PGC 5201, UGC 956, GC 299, MGC +05-04-052, 2MASS J01243853+3328214, h 113

NGC 515, also occasionally referred to as PGC 5201 or UGC 956, is a lenticular galaxy located approximately 228 million light-years from the Solar System in the constellation Pisces. It was discovered on 13 September 1784 by astronomer William Herschel.

== Observation history ==
Herschel discovered the object along with NGC 517 using Beta Andromedae as a reference star. He described his discovery as "two, both stellar", indicating his misidentification of the object as a star. The position noted for NGC 515 is just 35 seconds east of UGC 956, thus the two entries are generally thought to be the same object. The object was also observed by John Herschel, son of William Herschel and later catalogued by John Louis Emil Dreyer in the New General Catalogue, where the galaxy was described as "pretty faint, very small, round, northwestern of 2" with the other one being NGC 517.

== Description ==
The galaxy has an apparent visual magnitude of 13.1 and can be classified as type S0 using the Hubble Sequence. The object's distance of roughly 230 million light-years from the Solar System can be estimated using its redshift and Hubble's law.

== See also ==
- Lenticular galaxy
- List of NGC objects (1–1000)
- Pisces (constellation)
