= NGC 480 =

Spiral galaxy in the constellation Cetus

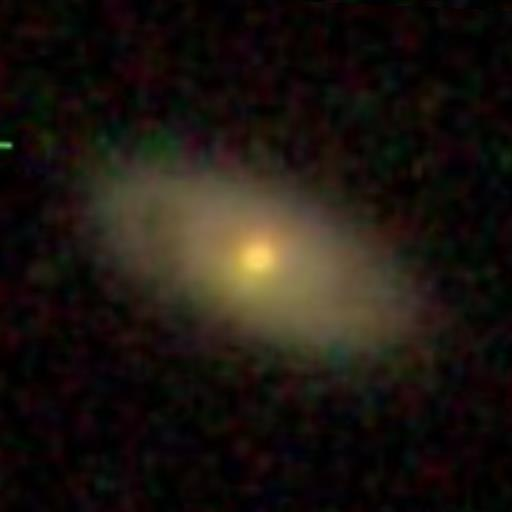
- SDSS image of NGC 480

Observation data (J2000 epoch)
- Constellation: Cetus
- Right ascension: 01^{h} 20^{m} 34.4^{s}
- Declination: −09° 52′ 49″
- Redshift: 0.042953 /12877 km/s
- Distance: 546 million ly
- Apparent magnitude (V): 15.8

Characteristics
- Type: Sab
- Size: ~99,800 ly (estimated)
- Apparent size (V): 0.55 x 0.28

Other designations
- PGC 4845

NGC 480 is a spiral galaxy located about 546 million light-years away from Earth in the constellation Cetus. NGC 480 was discovered by American astronomer Francis Leavenworth In 1886.

== See also ==
- Barred spiral galaxy
- List of NGC objects (1–1000)
- NGC 1300
- NGC 491
