= NGC 512 =

Spiral galaxy in the constellation Andromeda

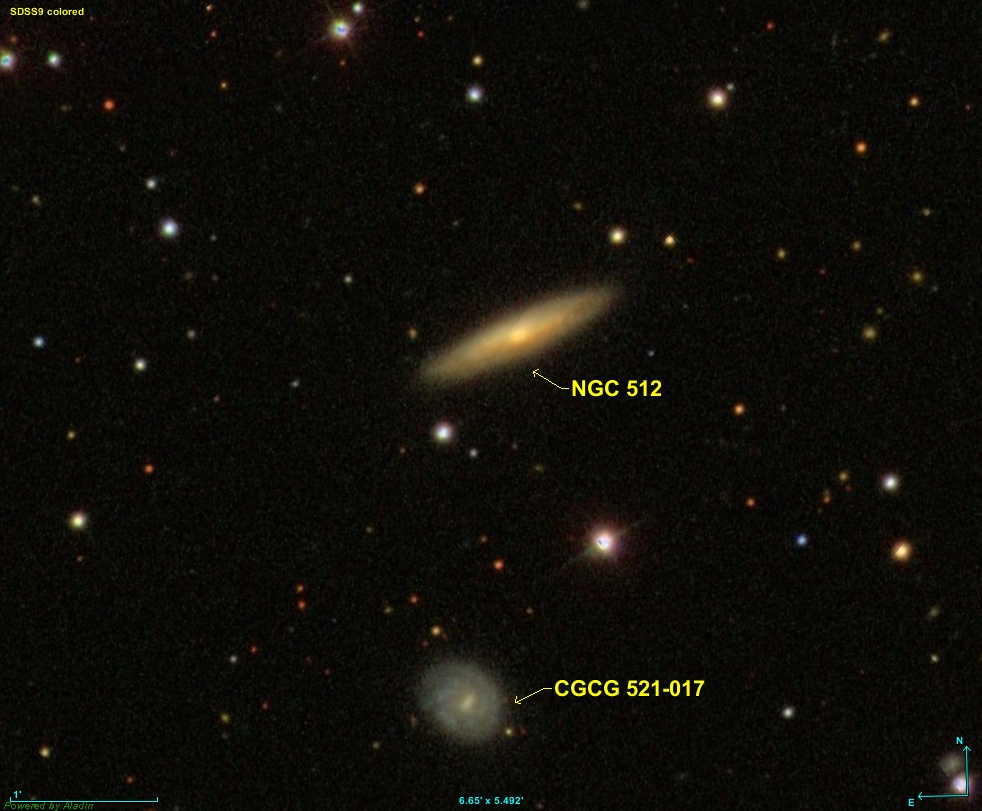
- SDSS view of NGC 512

Observation data (J2000 epoch)
- Constellation: Andromeda
- Right ascension: 01^{h} 23^{m} 59.8^{s}
- Declination: +33° 23′ 59.8″
- Redshift: 0.016175 ± 0.000107
- Heliocentric radial velocity: (4810 ± 32) km/s
- Distance: 217 Mly
- Apparent magnitude (V): 13.3
- Apparent magnitude (B): 14.1

Characteristics
- Type: Sab
- Apparent size (V): 1.6' × 0.4'

Other designations
- PGC 5132, UGC 944, GC 296, MGC +06-04-013, 2MASS J01235976+3354281, IRAS F01211+3338

NGC 512, also occasionally referred to as PGC 5132 or UGC 944, is a spiral galaxy in the constellation Andromeda. It is located approximately 217 million light-years from the Solar System and was discovered on 17 November 1827 by astronomer John Herschel.

== Observation history ==
Herschel's discovery is based on a single observation. He described the object as "very faint, very small". The position is just 23" from UGC 944, thus the two objects are generally regarded as equivalent. John Louis Emil Dreyer, creator of the New General Catalogue, added the object to the catalogue, adopting Herschel's description.

== Description ==
The galaxy has an apparent size of 1.6 × 0.4 arcmins and appears very elongated. It has a recessional velocity of approximately 4810 kilometers per second. The distance of NGC 512 from the Solar System can be estimated using Hubble's law, which puts the object at roughly 220 million light-years from the Sun.

== See also ==
- List of NGC objects (1–1000)
