= NGC 498 =

Galaxy in the constellation Pisces

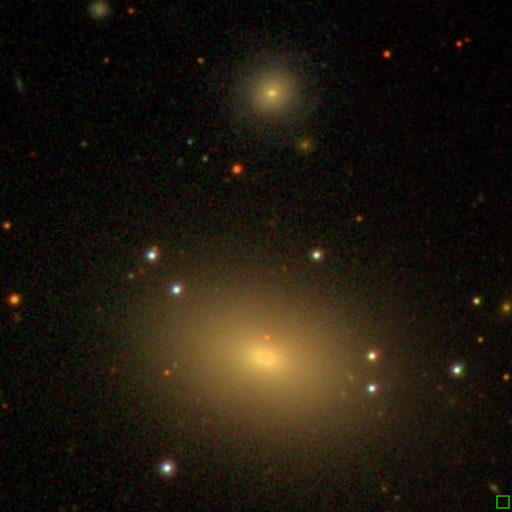
- SDSS image of NGC 498 and NGC 499 (bottom)

Observation data (J2000 epoch)
- Constellation: Pisces
- Right ascension: 01^{h} 23^{m} 11.3^{s}
- Declination: 33° 29′ 22″
- Redshift: 0.020518/6151 km/s
- Distance: 261.13 Mly
- Group or cluster: NGC 507 Group
- Apparent magnitude (V): 16

Characteristics
- Type: S0
- Size: ~19,560 ly (estimated)
- Apparent size (V): 0.25 x 0.25

Other designations
- MCG 5-4-37, NPM1G +33.0043, PGC 5059

NGC 498 is a lenticular galaxy located about 260 million light-years away from Earth, in the constellation Pisces. NGC 498 was discovered by astronomer R. J. Mitchell on October 23, 1856.

NGC 498 is a member of the NGC 507 Group which is part of the Perseus–Pisces Supercluster.

== See also ==
- Lenticular galaxy
- List of NGC objects (1–1000)
