= NGC 591 =

Lenticular galaxy in the constellation Andromeda

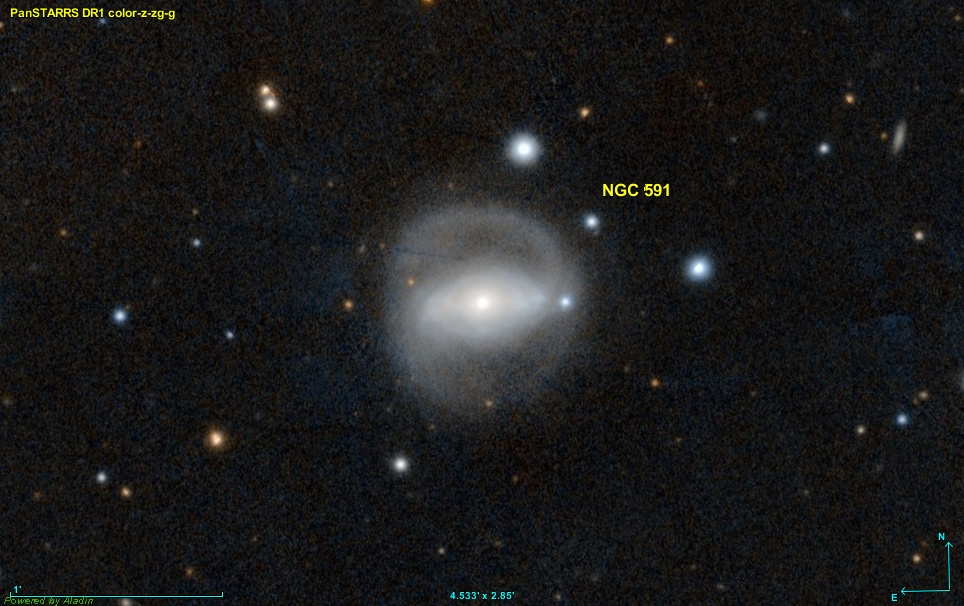

Observation data
- Constellation: Andromeda
- Right ascension: 01^{h} 33^{m} 31.2^{s}
- Declination: 35° 40′ 06″
- Distance: 206,000,000
- Apparent magnitude (V): 12.9
- Absolute magnitude (V): -2.01

Characteristics
- Type: Lenticular

Other designations
- Mrk 1157

NGC 591 is a lenticular galaxy in the constellation Andromeda, located 206 million light years from Earth. It was discovered by Truman Safford on 10 October 1866.

== Characteristics ==
NGC 591 has an apparent magnitude of 13 and an absolute magnitude of -2.01. It is moving at 4549 km/s relative to Earth. It has an angular size of 1.3 x 1.0 milliarcseconds.

== Supermassive black hole ==
A 2007 study of supermassive black hole masses estimated the mass of the black hole at the center of NGC 591 to be 6.8 million solar masses.

Another study in 2012, which used the velocity dispersion in the center of the galaxy to find the black hole's mass, produced an estimate of 11 million solar masses.

== NGC 507 group ==
NGC 591 is part of the NGC 507 galaxy group. This group includes 42 galaxies, 21 of which are listed in the New General Catalogue and 5 of which are listed in the Index Catalogue. Four are Markarian galaxies.
