= NGC 582 =

Galaxy in the constellation Triangulum

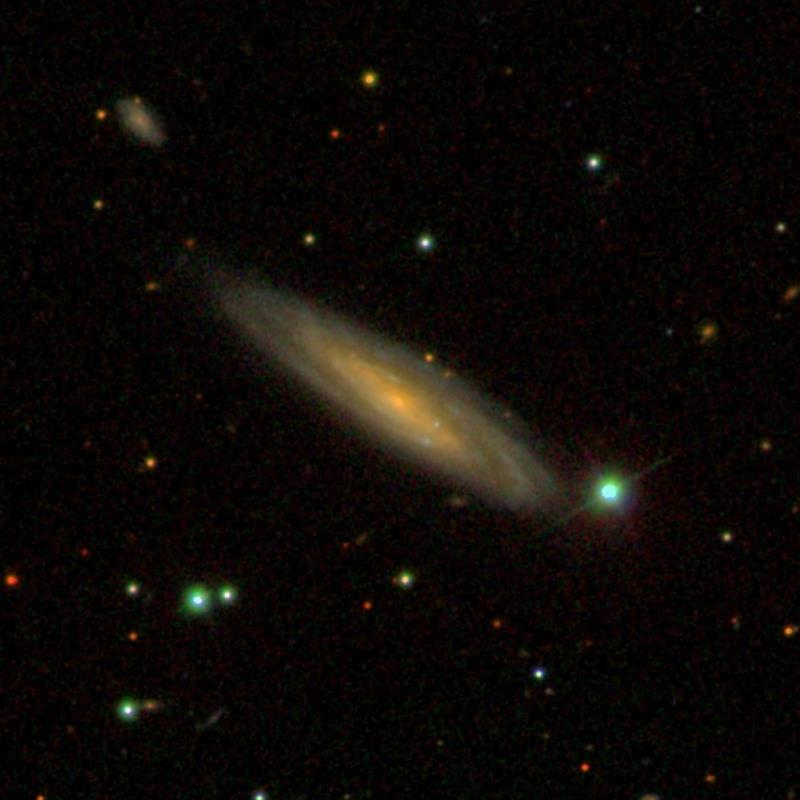
- NGC 582 imaged by SDSS

Observation data (J2000 epoch)
- Constellation: Triangulum
- Right ascension: 01^{h} 31^{m} 58.0605^{s}
- Declination: +33° 28′ 35.577″
- Redshift: 0.014497±0.00000900
- Heliocentric radial velocity: 4,346±3 km/s
- Distance: 195.38 ± 3.28 Mly (59.904 ± 1.006 Mpc)
- Group or cluster: NGC 499 Group (LGG 24)
- Apparent magnitude (V): 14.1

Characteristics
- Type: SB
- Size: ~130,700 ly (40.08 kpc) (estimated)
- Apparent size (V): 2.2′ × 0.6′

Other designations
- IRAS 01291+3313, 2MASX J01315804+3328354, UGC 1094, MCG +05-04-065, PGC 5702, CGCG 502-105

NGC 582 is a barred spiral galaxy in the constellation of Triangulum. Its velocity with respect to the cosmic microwave background is 4,070±20 km/s, which corresponds to a Hubble distance of 195.8 ± 13.7 Mly (60.02 ± 4.21 Mpc). Additionally, 25 non-redshift measurements give a similar mean distance of 195.38 ± 3.28 Mly (59.904 ± 1.006 Mpc). It was discovered by German astronomer Heinrich Louis d'Arrest on 9 August 1863.

NGC 582 has a possible active galactic nucleus, i.e. it has a compact region at the center of a galaxy that emits a significant amount of energy across the electromagnetic spectrum, with characteristics indicating that this luminosity is not produced by the stars.

== NGC 499 group ==
NGC 582 is a member of the NGC 499 Group (also known as LGG 24). There are six galaxies in the group, including NGC 495, NGC 499, NGC 504, NGC 517, and LEDA 5026.

== Supernovae ==
Two supernovae have been observed in NGC 582:

- SN 2015cz (Type II-P, mag. 16.5) was discovered by Jiaming Liao, Guoyou Sun, and Xing Gao on 2 October 2015.
- SN 2020lkb (Type II, mag. 17.2) was discovered by Kōichi Itagaki on 30 May 2020.

== See also ==
- List of NGC objects (1–1000)
