= NGC 495 =

Galaxy in the constellation Pisces

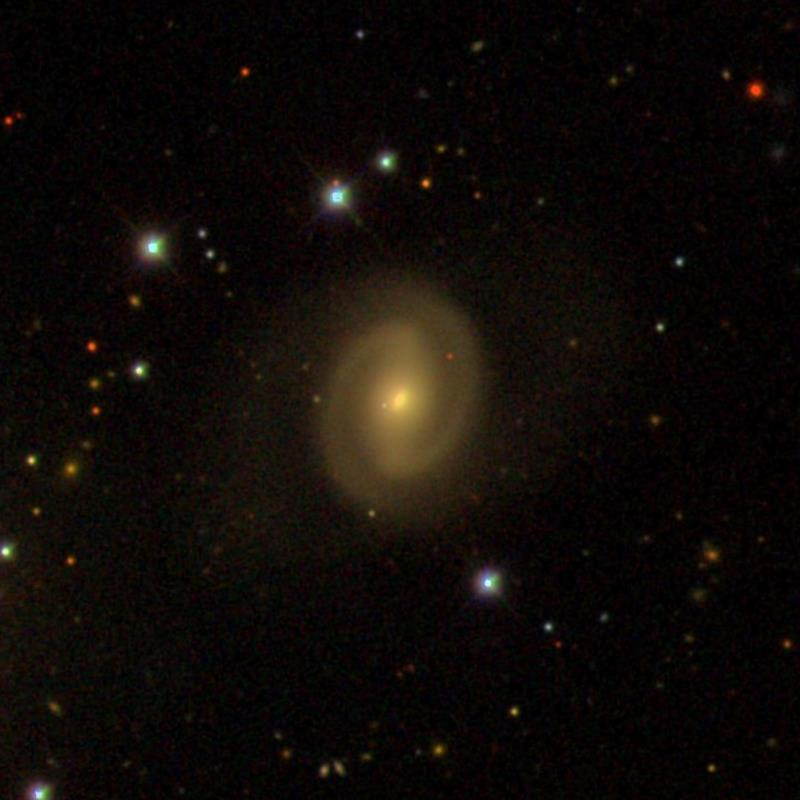
- SDSS view of NGC 495

Observation data (J2000 epoch)
- Constellation: Pisces
- Right ascension: 01^{h} 22^{m} 56.0^{s}
- Declination: +33° 28′ 18″
- Redshift: +0.013679 ± 0.000073
- Heliocentric radial velocity: (4073 ± 22) km/s
- Distance: 184 Mly
- Apparent magnitude (V): 13.0

Characteristics
- Type: SB0-a
- Apparent size (V): 1.2' × 0.8'

Other designations
- PGC 5037, UGC 920, GC 278, MCG 5-4-35, 2MASS J01225595+3328171, H 3.156,

NGC 495, also occasionally referred to as PGC 5037, UGC 920 or GC 278, is a barred spiral galaxy in the constellation Pisces. It is located approximately 184 million light-years from the Solar System and was discovered on 12 September 1784 by astronomer William Herschel.

NGC 495 is part of a galaxy group known as LGG 24. It has at least 6 members, which are NGC 499, NGC 517, NGC 504, NGC 582 and PGC 5026.

== Observation history ==
The object was discovered by Herschel along with NGC 496 and NGC 499. He initially described the discovery as "Three [NGC 495 along with NGC 496 and 499], eS and F, forming a triangle.". As he observed the trio again the next night, he was able to make out more detail: "Three, forming a [right triangle]; the [right angle] to the south NGC 499, the short leg preceding [NGC 495], the long towards the north [NGC 496]. Those in the legs [NGC 495 and 496] the faintest imaginable; that at the rectangle [NGC 499] a deal larger and brighter, but still very faint."

NGC 495 was later also observed by Heinrich d'Arrest and Herman Schultz who first noted the object's accurate position. This position is also noted in the New General Catalogue.

== Description ==
John Dreyer, creator of the New General Catalogue, uses Herschel's initial notation to describe the position of NGC 495 ("very faint, small, 1st of 3").

Modern observations however call NGC 495 a bright central galaxy with an apparent size of about 1.2' by 0.8'. It also includes fainter outer extensions, about 2.6' by 1.5'. The galaxy is also classified as a barred spiral galaxy of Hubble type SB0-a.

== Supernova ==
One supernova has been observed in NGC 495: SN 1999ej (Type Ia, mag. 18.1) was discovered by the Lick Observatory Supernova Search (LOSS) on 18 October 1999.

== See also ==
- Barred Spiral Galaxy
- List of NGC objects (1–1000)
- Pisces (constellation)
