= NGC 501 =

Elliptical galaxy in the constellation Pisces

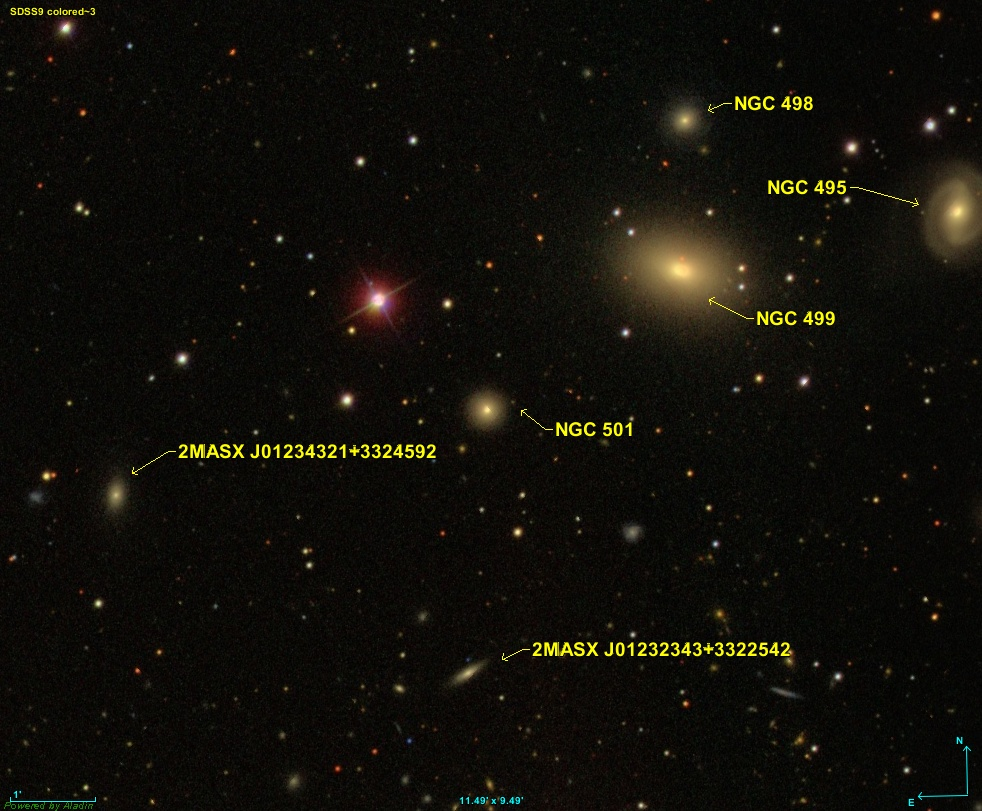
- SDSS view of NGC 501

Observation data (J2000 epoch)
- Constellation: Pisces
- Right ascension: 01^{h} 23^{m} 22.4^{s}
- Declination: +33° 25′ 59″
- Redshift: 0.016561 ± 0.000227
- Heliocentric radial velocity: (4924 ± 68) km/s
- Distance: 224 Mly
- Apparent magnitude (V): 14.5
- Apparent magnitude (B): 15.5

Characteristics
- Type: E0
- Apparent size (V): 0.5' × 0.5'

Other designations
- PGC 5082, GC 284, 2MASS J01232240+3325582

NGC 501, also occasionally referred to as PGC 5082 or GC 284, is an elliptical galaxy in the constellation Pisces. It is located approximately 224 million light-years from the Solar System and was discovered on 28 October 1856 by Irish astronomer R. J. Mitchell.

== Observation history ==
Although John Dreyer, creator of the New General Catalogue, credits the discovery to astronomer William Parsons, 3rd Earl of Rosse, he notes that many of his claimed discoveries were made by one of his assistants. In the case of NGC 501, the discovery was made by R. J. Mitchell, who discovered it using Lord Rosse's 72" reflecting telescope at Birr Castle in County Offaly, Ireland. The object was described "very faint, small (E in Birr diagram)" in the New General Catalogue.

== See also ==
- Elliptical galaxy
- List of NGC objects (1–1000)
- Pisces (constellation)
