= NGC 496 =

Galaxy in the constellation Pisces

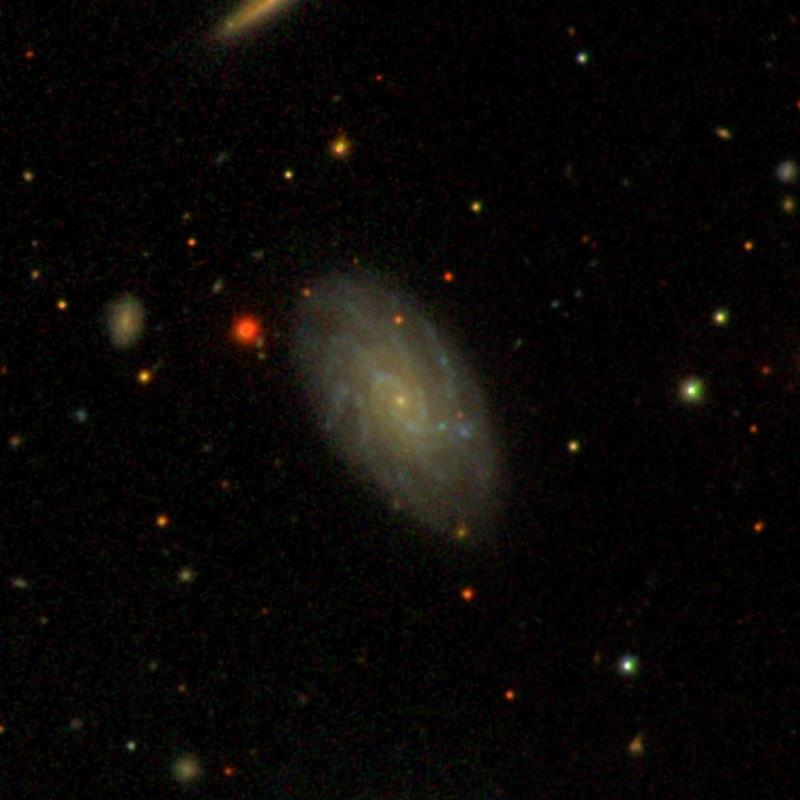
- SDSS view of NGC 496

Observation data (J2000 epoch)
- Constellation: Pisces
- Right ascension: 01^{h} 23^{m} 11.6^{s}
- Declination: +33° 31′ 45″
- Redshift: +0.020258 ± 0.000093
- Heliocentric radial velocity: (6011.7 ± 27.8) km/s
- Distance: 250 Mly
- Apparent magnitude (V): 13.4

Characteristics
- Type: Sbc
- Apparent size (V): 1.6' × 0.9'

Other designations
- PGC 5061, UGC 927, GC 288, MCG 5-4-36, 2MASS J01231161+3331452, H 3.157, IRAS 01203+3316, CGCG 502-60, KUG 0120+332A

NGC 496, also occasionally referred to as PGC 5037, UGC 927 or GC 288, is a spiral galaxy in the constellation Pisces. It is located approximately 250 million light-years from the Solar System and was discovered on 12 September 1784 by astronomer William Herschel.

== Observation history ==
The object was discovered by Herschel along with NGC 495 and NGC 499. He initially described the discovery as "Three [NGC 496 along with NGC 495 and 499], eS and F, forming a triangle.". As he observed the trio again the next night, he was able to make out more detail: "Three, forming a [right triangle]; the [right angle] to the south NGC 499, the short leg preceding [NGC 496], the long towards the north [NGC 495]. Those in the legs [NGC 496 and 495] the faintest imaginable; that at the rectangle [NGC 499] a deal larger and brighter, but still very faint."

NGC 496 was later also observed by Bindon Blood Stoney. This position is also noted in the New General Catalogue.

== See also ==
- Spiral Galaxy
- List of NGC objects (1–1000)
- Pisces (constellation)
