= NGC 487 =

Galaxy in the constellation Cetus

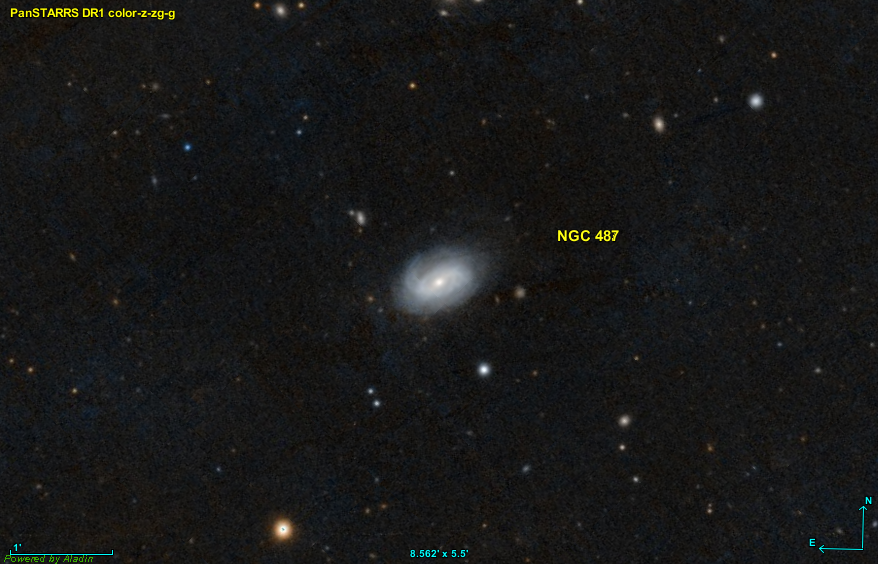
- Pan-STARRS image of NGC 487

Observation data (J2000 epoch)
- Constellation: Cetus
- Right ascension: 01^{h} 21^{m} 55.1^{s}
- Declination: −16° 22′ 13″
- Redshift: 0.019844/5,949 km/s
- Distance: 250 million ly
- Apparent magnitude (V): 14.41

Characteristics
- Type: SB(r)a
- Apparent size (V): 1.1' × 0.7'

Other designations
- MCG -3-4-56, PGC 4958

NGC 487 is a barred spiral galaxy located about 250 million light-years away from Earth in the constellation Cetus. NGC 487's calculated velocity is 5,949 km/s. NGC 487 was discovered by American astronomer Francis Leavenworth on November 28, 1885.

== See also ==
- List of NGC objects (1–1000)
- NGC 1300
- NGC 491
