= NGC 523 =

Spiral galaxy in constellation Andromeda

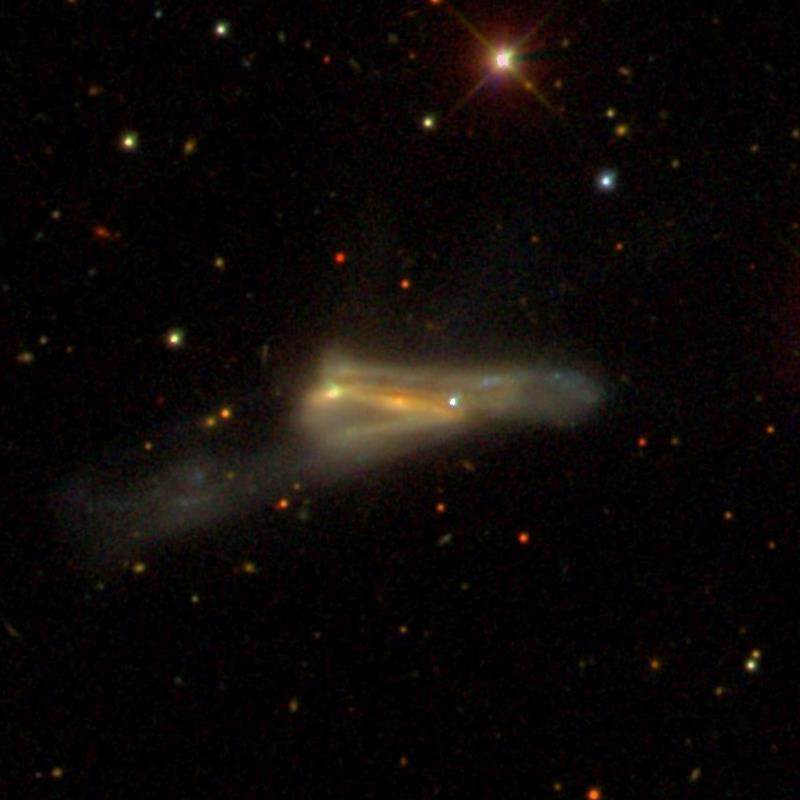
- NGC 523 imaged by SDSS

Observation data (J2000 epoch)
- Constellation: Andromeda
- Right ascension: 01^{h} 25^{m} 20.7140^{s}
- Declination: +34° 01′ 30.524″
- Redshift: 0.0159
- Heliocentric radial velocity: 4,761±2 km/s
- Galactocentric velocity: 4,481±20 km/s
- Distance: 203.46 ± 6.55 Mly (62.381 ± 2.007 Mpc)
- Group or cluster: NGC 507 Group (LGG 26)
- Apparent magnitude (V): 12.7
- Apparent magnitude (B): 13.5

Characteristics
- Type: SBc/Pec
- Size: ~189,400 ly (58.07 kpc) (estimated)
- Apparent size (V): 2.5′ × 0.7′

Other designations
- IRAS 01225+3345, NGC 537, Arp 158, UGC 979, MCG +06-04-018, PGC 5268, CGCG 521-022, VV 783

NGC 523, also known as Arp 158 from the ARP catalog, is a spiral galaxy located in the constellation Andromeda. It was discovered by German-British astronomer William Herschel on 13 September 1784. Heinrich d'Arrest rediscovered it on 13 August 1862 and listed it as NGC 523, whereas Herschel's original discovery was listed as NGC 537. John Dreyer noted in the New General Catalogue that NGC 523 is a double nebula.

== Supernova ==
One supernova has been observed in NGC 523: SN 2001en (Type Ia, mag. 17.5) was discovered by LOTOSS (Lick Observatory and Tenagra Observatory Supernova Searches) on 26 September 2001.

== NGC 507 Group ==
NGC 523 is part of the NGC 507 group (also known as LGG 26). This large group includes at least 42 galaxies, of which 21 are in the New General Catalogue and 5 in the Index Catalog. Four members of this group are also Markarian galaxies. The brightest of these galaxies is NGC 507 and the largest is NGC 536.

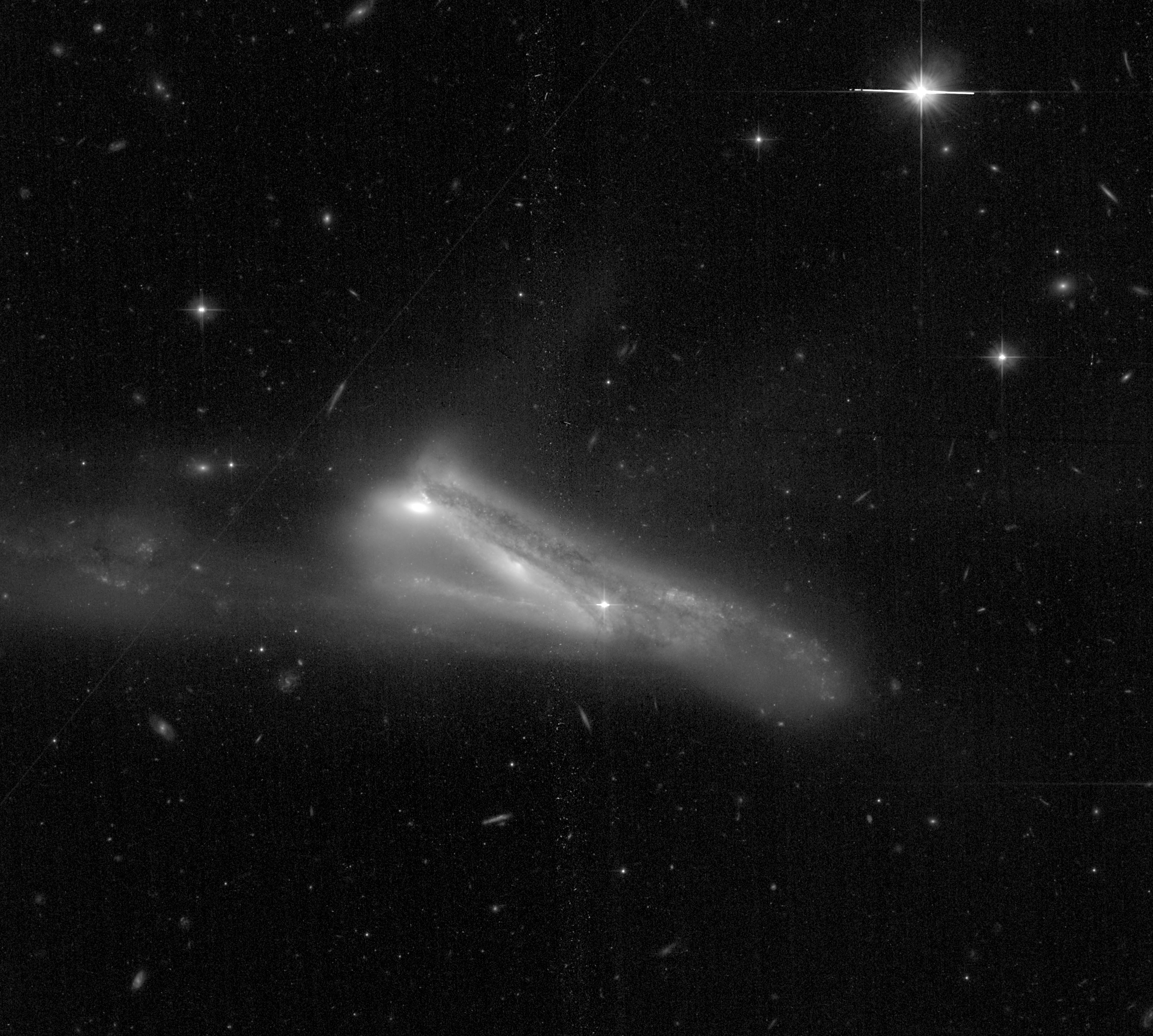
NGC 523 imaged by the Hubble Space Telescope

== See also ==
- Spiral galaxy
- List of NGC objects (1–1000)
- Andromeda (constellation)
