= NGC 499 =

Galaxy in the constellation Pisces

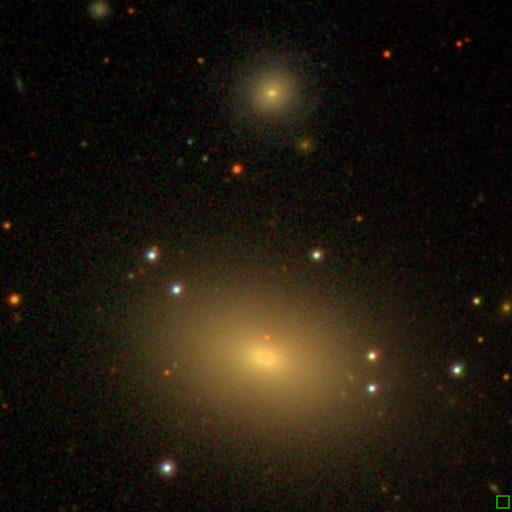
- SDSS view of NGC 499 and the smaller NGC 498

Observation data (J2000 epoch)
- Constellation: Pisces
- Right ascension: 01^{h} 23^{m} 11.5^{s}
- Declination: +33° 27′ 28″
- Redshift: +0.014691 ± 0.000117
- Heliocentric radial velocity: (4372 ± 35.2) km/s
- Distance: 197 Mly
- Apparent magnitude (V): 12.2

Characteristics
- Type: E-S0
- Apparent size (V): 1.7' × 1.3'

Other designations
- PGC 5060, IC 1686, UGC 926, GC 289, MCG 5-4-38, 2MASS J01231145+3327362, H 3.158, h 106, CGCG 502-059

NGC 499, also occasionally referred to as PGC 5060, IC 1686 or GC 289, is a lenticular galaxy in the constellation Pisces. It is located approximately 197 million light-years from the Solar System and was discovered on 12 September 1784 by astronomer William Herschel.

The NGC 499 Group is named after the galaxy. NGC 499 is part of a galaxy group known as NGC 499 Group or LGG 24. It has at least 6 members, which are NGC 495, NGC 517, NGC 504, NGC 582 and PGC 5026.

== Observation history ==
The object was discovered by Herschel along with NGC 495 and NGC 496. He initially described the discovery as "Three [NGC 499 along with NGC 495 and 496], eS and F, forming a triangle.". As he observed the trio again the next night, he was able to make out more detail: "Three, forming a [right triangle]; the [right angle] to the south NGC 499, the short leg preceding [NGC 496], the long towards the north [NGC 495]. Those in the legs [NGC 496 and 495] the faintest imaginable; that at the rectangle [NGC 499] a deal larger and brighter, but still very faint."

NGC 499 was later also observed by William Herschel's son John Herschel and independently found by Stéphane Javelle in 1899.

== See also ==
- Lenticular Galaxy
- List of NGC objects (1–1000)
- Pisces (constellation)
