= NGC 528 =

Galaxy in constellation Andromeda

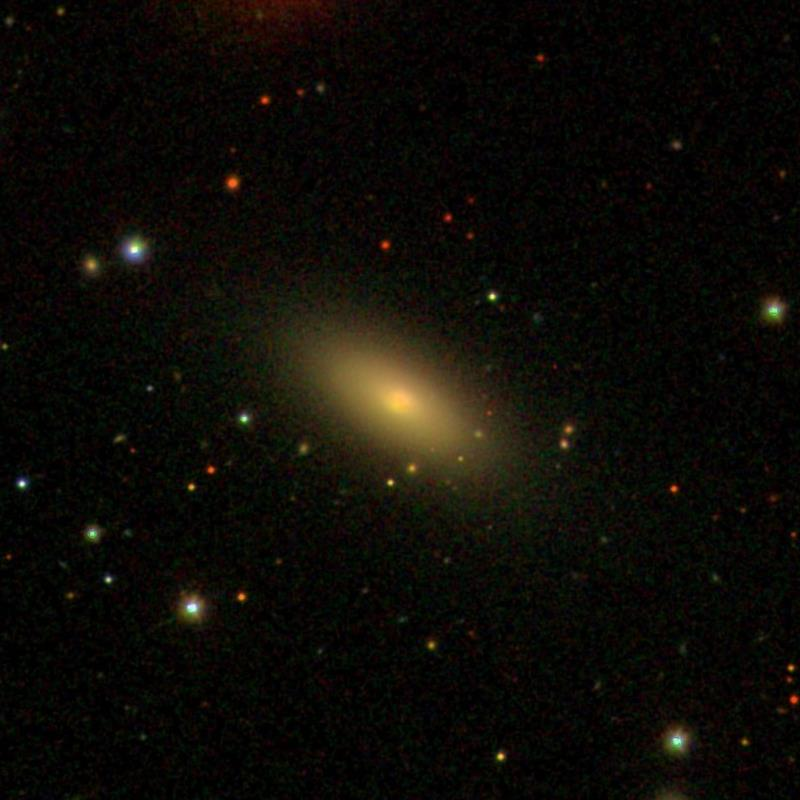
- SDSS image of NGC 528

Observation data (J2000 epoch)
- Constellation: Andromeda
- Right ascension: 01^{h} 25^{m} 33.60^{s}
- Declination: +33° 40′ 18.0″
- Redshift: 4807 km/s
- Heliocentric radial velocity: 0.016034
- Distance: 233.53 ± 10.68 Mly (71.600 ± 3.274 Mpc)
- Apparent magnitude (B): 13.7

Characteristics
- Type: S0
- Apparent size (V): 1.7′ × 1.1′

Other designations
- NGC 528, UGC 988, MCG +05-04-057, PGC 5290

NGC 528 is a lenticular galaxy located in the constellation Andromeda. It is located an estimated 70 million parsecs from the Milky Way. The object was discovered on 22 August 1865 by the German-Danish astronomer Heinrich Ludwig d'Arrest.

== See also ==
- List of NGC objects (1–1000)
