= NGC 608 =

Galaxy in the constellation Triangulum

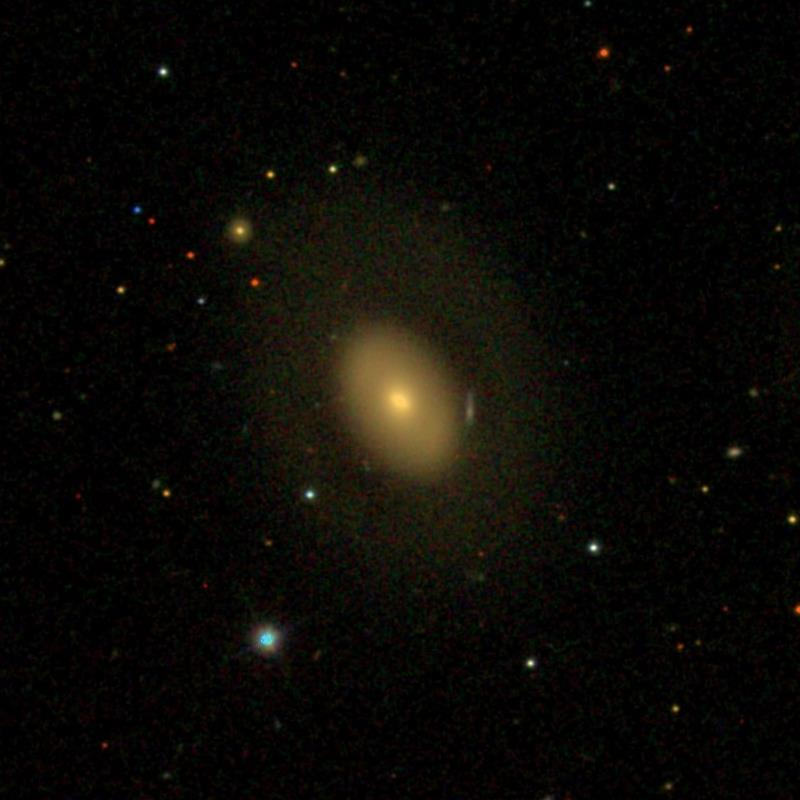
- SDSS image of NGC 608

Observation data (J2000 epoch)
- Constellation: Triangulum
- Right ascension: 01^{h} 35^{m} 28.23015^{s}
- Declination: +33° 39′ 24.2256″
- Redshift: 0.016998
- Heliocentric radial velocity: 5053 km/s
- Distance: 226.9 Mly (69.57 Mpc)
- Apparent magnitude (B): 14.0

Characteristics
- Type: S0

Other designations
- UGC 1135, MCG +05-04-073, PGC 5913

NGC 608 is a lenticular galaxy in the constellation Triangulum. It is estimated to be about 230 million light-years from the Milky Way. It has a diameter of approximately 130,000 light-years. NGC 608 was discovered on November 22, 1827, by astronomer John Herschel.

== See also ==
- List of NGC objects (1–1000)
