= NGC 210 =

Galaxy in the constellation Cetus

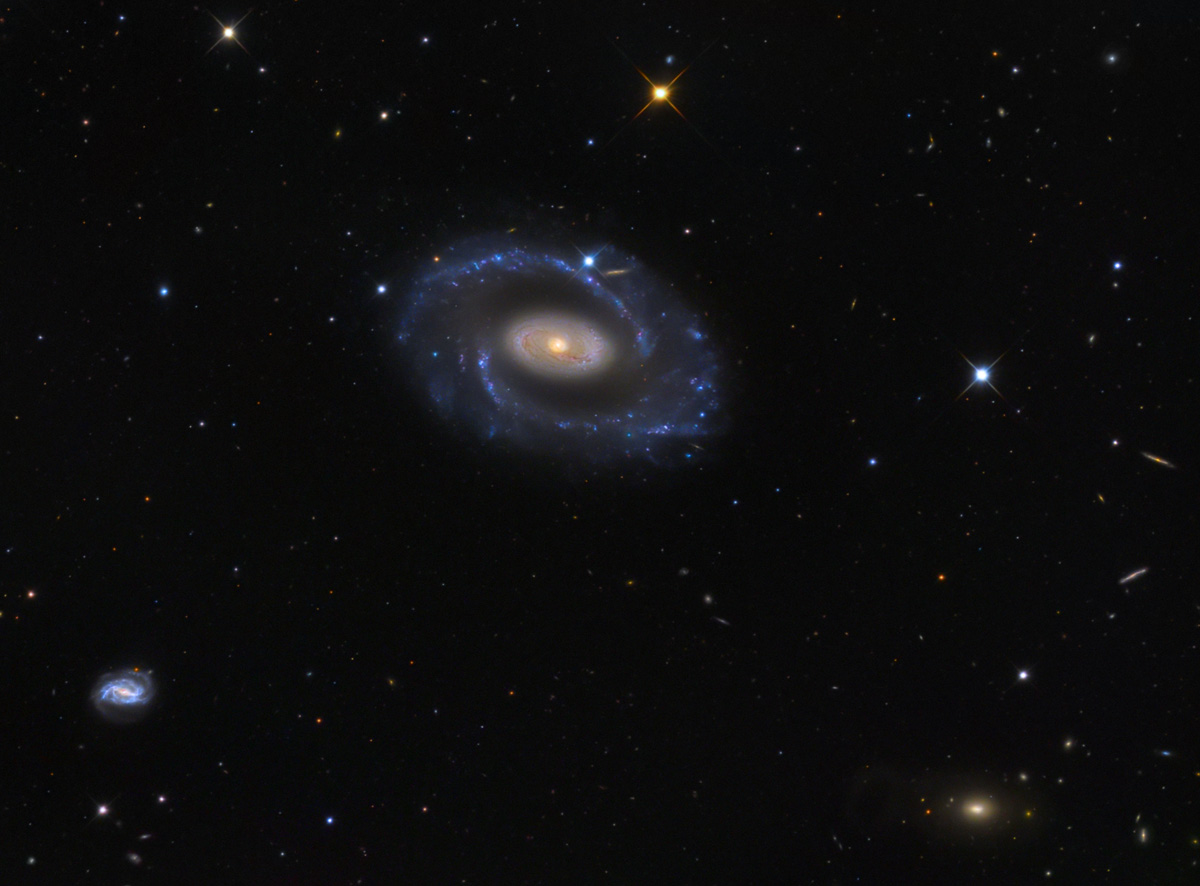
- NGC 210 by Adam Block/Mount Lemmon SkyCenter

Observation data (J2000.0 epoch)
- Constellation: Cetus
- Right ascension: 00^{h} 40^{m} 35.0^{s}
- Declination: −13° 52′ 20″
- Redshift: 0.005457
- Heliocentric radial velocity: 1636 km/s (1016.5 mi/s)
- Distance: 20.5 ± 1.5 Mpc (67 ± 5 Mly.)
- Apparent magnitude (V): 11

Characteristics
- Type: SAB(s)b or Sb D
- Apparent size (V): 5.012' x 3.09'

Other designations
- MCG -02-02-081, 2MASX J00403502-1352220, 2MASXi J0040349-135221, IRAS 00380-1408, IRAS F00380-1408, AKARI J0040346-135214, CGS 126, 6dF J0040350-135222, LDCE 0041, HDCE 0030, USGC S024, AGC 400333, GSC 5271 00477, HIPASS J0040-13, PGC 2437

NGC 210 is a barred spiral galaxy located roughly 67 million light-years from the Solar System in the constellation Cetus. It was discovered on October 3, 1785 by William Herschel and later added to the New General Catalogue.

== Physical properties ==
It appears to be in loose association with NGC 157 and NGC 131. It is noted for its peculiar arms, which appear to be in the process of becoming a ring galaxy. They also have several apparently dense regions throughout them. The inner part of the galaxy appears to be lenticular, with a dust lane in it. The nucleus of the galaxy appears much brighter than the rest of it, suggesting an active galactic nucleus.

=== Satellites ===
In the image at the right, 2MASX J00403079-1353088 is the edge-on galaxy directly below the brightest star in the image. It is possibly a satellite of NGC 210, but without a redshift to determine its distance, it could just as possibly be completely unrelated to NGC 210.

== Supernova ==
SN 1954R (type unknown, mag. 15.9) was discovered by Fritz Zwicky on 7 September 1954 in the outer edge of NGC 210's left arm, and is likely associated with the galaxy.

== Gallery ==
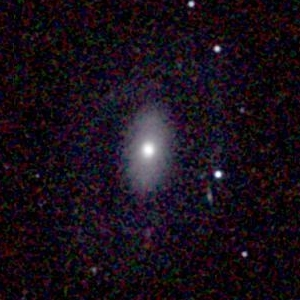
2MASS Near-infrared image of NGC 210

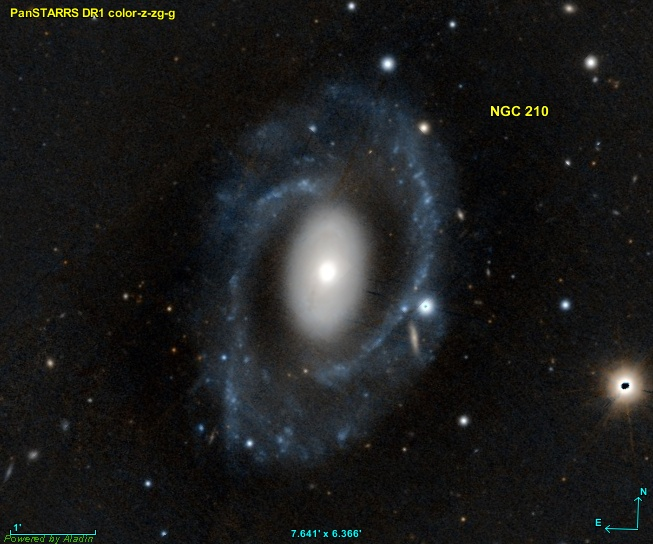
PanSTARRS image of NGC 210
