= NGC 53 =

Ringed barred spiral galaxy in the constellation Tucana

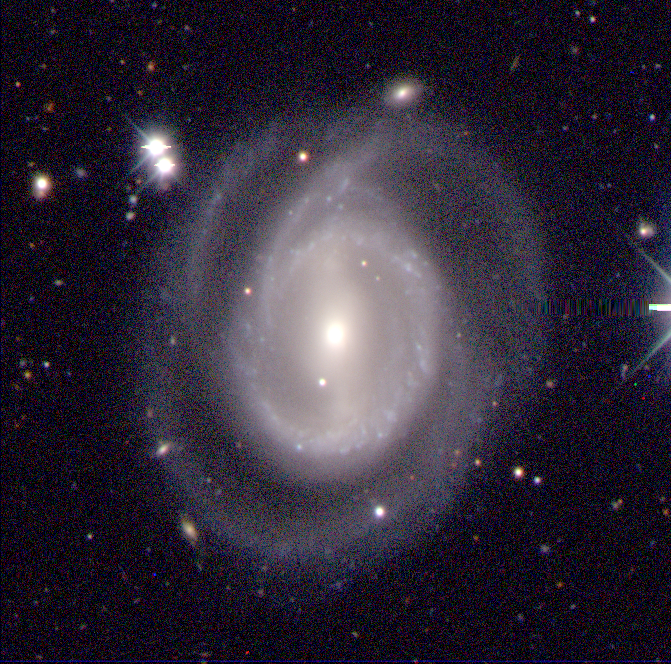
- DECam image of NGC 53 and nearby stars

Observation data (2000.0 epoch)
- Constellation: Tucana
- Right ascension: 00^{h} 14^{m} 41.8^{s}
- Declination: −60° 19′ 39″
- Redshift: 0.015237 ± 0.000087
- Heliocentric radial velocity: 4570 km/s
- Distance: 200,000,000ly (65,000,000 Parsecs)
- Apparent magnitude (V): 13.50

Characteristics
- Type: (R)SB(r)ab
- Size: 120,000 light years
- Apparent size (V): 1.698′ × 1.047′

Other designations
- PGC 982 ESO 111- G 020 ESO 001215-6036.4 AM 0012-603 FAIRALL 3 2MASX J00144279-6019425 IRAS F00122-6036 SGC 01215-6036.4 ESO-LV 1110200 2MIG 25 6dF J0014427-601942 6dF J0014428-601942 APMBGC 111-079+028 APMUKS(BJ) B001216.14-603622.4

NGC 53 is a ringed barred spiral galaxy in the constellation Tucana. It was discovered by John Herschel on 15 September 1836. He described it as "very faint, small, extended". The galaxy is approximately 120,000 light-years across, making it about as large as the Milky Way.

== See also ==
- List of NGC objects (1–1000)
