= NGC 491 =

Barred spiral galaxy in the constellation of Sculptor

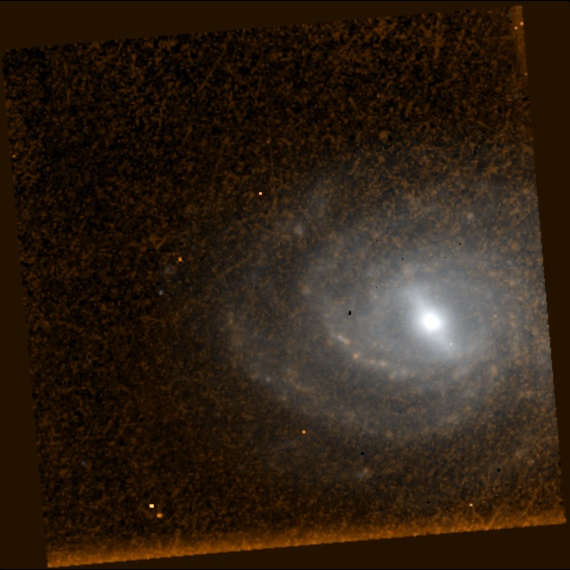
- NGC 491 imaged by the Hubble Space Telescope, showing its spiral arms

Observation data (J2000 epoch)
- Constellation: Sculptor
- Right ascension: 01^{h} 21^{m} 20.4504^{s}
- Declination: −34° 03′ 48.096″
- Redshift: 0.012902±0.0000330
- Heliocentric radial velocity: 3,868±10 km/s
- Distance: 203.09 ± 7.02 Mly (62.267 ± 2.152 Mpc)
- Apparent magnitude (V): 13.21

Characteristics
- Type: SB(rs)b
- Size: ~91,900 ly (28.17 kpc) (estimated)
- Apparent size (V): 1.4′ × 1.0′

Other designations
- ESO 352- G 053, GC 279, IRAS 01190-3419, MCG -06-04-011, PGC 4914

NGC 491 is a barred spiral galaxy in the constellation Sculptor. Its velocity with respect to the cosmic microwave background is 3,635±19 km/s, which corresponds to a Hubble distance of 174.9 ± 12.3 Mly (53.62 ± 3.77 Mpc). However, nine non-redshift measurements give a farther mean distance of 203.09 ± 7.02 Mly (62.267 ± 2.152 Mpc). It was discovered by British astronomer John Herschel on 25 September 1834.

NGC 491 is a Seyfert II galaxy, i.e. it has a quasar-like nucleus with very high surface brightnesses whose spectra reveal strong, high-ionisation emission lines, but unlike quasars, the host galaxy is clearly detectable.

== Supernova ==
One supernova has been observed in NGC 491: SN 2025yjt (Type II, mag. 17.827) was discovered by ATLAS on 24 September 2025.

== Gallery ==
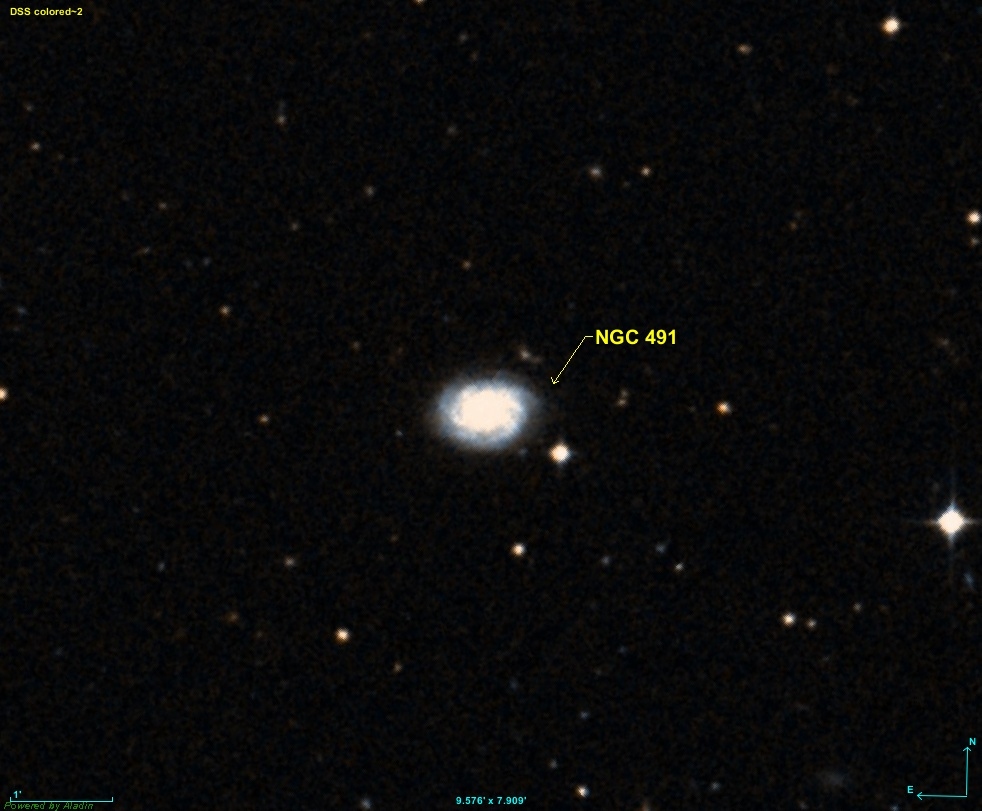
DSS image of NGC 491

== See also ==
- NGC 7001
- List of NGC objects (1–1000)
