= NGC 255 =

Galaxy in the constellation Cetus

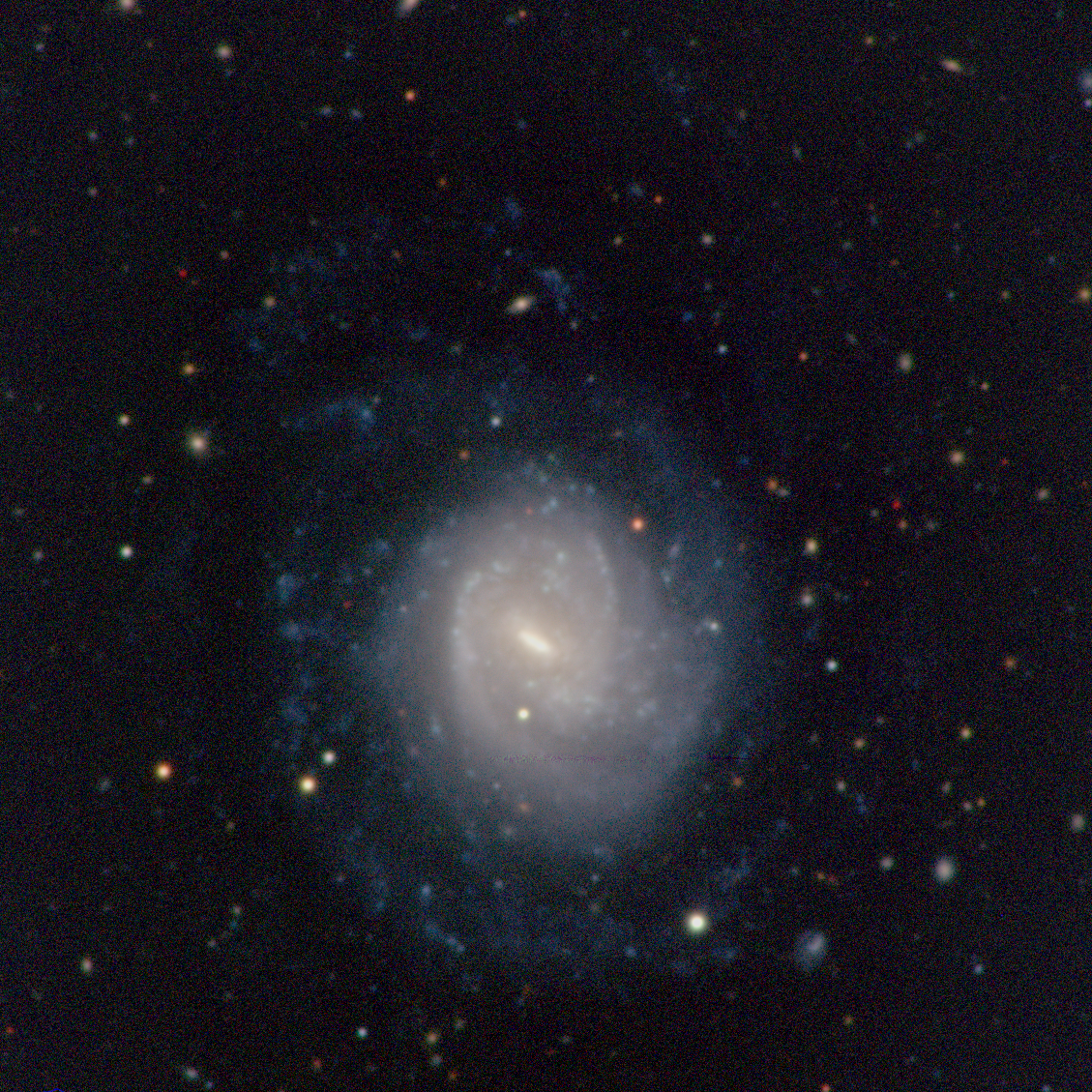
- NGC 255 with DECam

Observation data (J2000 epoch)
- Constellation: Cetus
- Right ascension: 00^{h} 47^{m} 47.309^{s}
- Declination: −11° 28′ 07.31″
- Redshift: 0.005287
- Heliocentric radial velocity: 1585 km/s
- Distance: 59.16 ± 4.75 Mly (18.140 ± 1.457 Mpc)
- Apparent magnitude (V): 11.70
- Apparent magnitude (B): 12.5
- Absolute magnitude (V): −19.59

Characteristics
- Type: SAB(rs)bc
- Size: 53,200 ly (16,310 pc) (Note: RC3 D_{0} (blue) values used.)
- Apparent size (V): 3.0′ × 2.5′

Other designations
- MGC -02-03-017, PGC 2802

NGC 255 is a barred spiral galaxy in the constellation Cetus. It was discovered on November 27, 1785, by Frederick William Herschel.
