= NGC 483 =

Spiral galaxy in the constellation Pisces

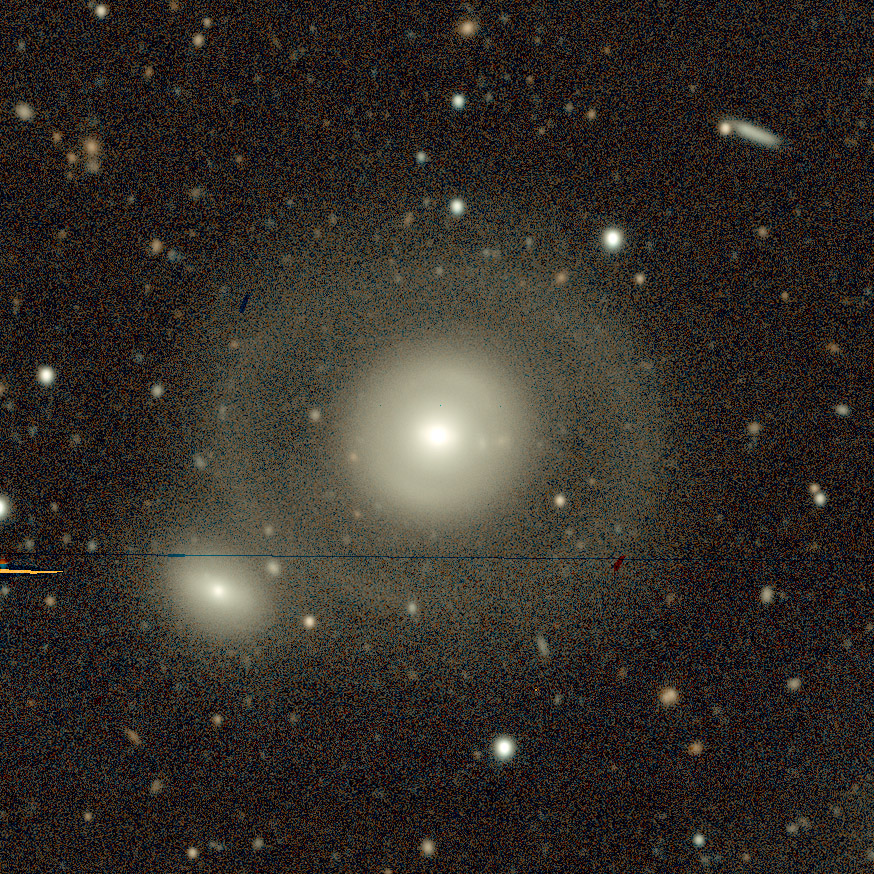
- legacy surveys image of NGC 483

Observation data (J2000 epoch)
- Constellation: Pisces
- Right ascension: 01^{h} 21^{m} 56.41^{s}
- Declination: +33° 31′ 15.6″
- Redshift: 0.01556 ± 0.00007
- Heliocentric radial velocity: (4628 ± 21) km/s
- Distance: 192 Mly
- Apparent magnitude (V): 13.2

Characteristics
- Type: S?
- Apparent size (V): 0.7′ × 0.7′

Other designations
- PGC 4961, GC 272, MCG +05-04-029, 2MASS J01215628+3331153, h 102

NGC 483 is a spiral galaxy in the constellation Pisces. It is located approximately 192 million light-years from Earth and was discovered on November 11, 1827 by astronomer John Herschel.

== See also ==
- Spiral galaxy
- List of NGC objects (1–1000)
