= NGC 178 =

Magellanic spiral galaxy in the constellation Cetus

- HST image of NGC 178

Observation data (J2000 epoch)
- Constellation: Cetus
- Right ascension: 00^{h} 39^{m} 08.392^{s}
- Declination: −14° 10′ 22.25″
- Redshift: 0.004863
- Heliocentric radial velocity: 1454.4 km/s
- Distance: 67 Mly (20.6 Mpc)
- Apparent magnitude (V): 12.6
- Apparent magnitude (B): 13.6

Characteristics
- Type: SB(s)m
- Size: 25 to 30 kly
- Apparent size (V): 1.85′ × 0.85′

Other designations
- 2MASX J00390839-1410222, IC 39, MCG -02-02-078, PGC 2349

NGC 178 is a Magellanic spiral galaxy in the constellation of Cetus. The compiler of the New General Catalogue, John Louis Emil Dreyer noted that NGC 178 was "faint, small, much extended 0°, brighter middle". It was discovered on November 3, 1885, by Ormond Stone.

Due to its high rate of star formation NGC 178 is a starburst galaxy. It is forming new stars at a rate of 0.55 M_{☉} per year. The peculiar morphology of this galaxy may be a sign of it being a galaxy merger.

== See also ==
- Spiral galaxy
- List of NGC objects (1–1000)
