= NGC 507 =

Galaxy in the constellation Pisces

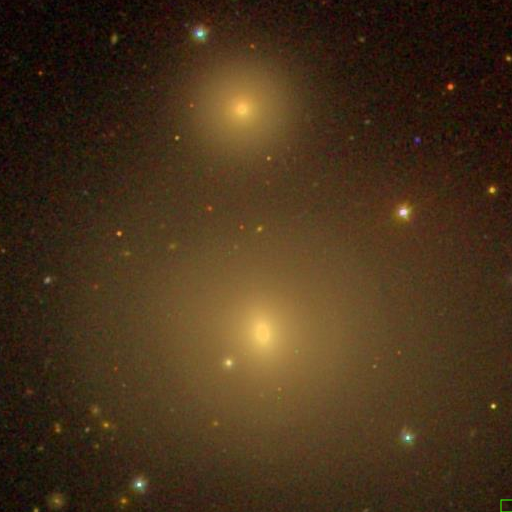
- SDSS view of NGC 507 (bottom) and NGC 508 (top)

Observation data (J2000 epoch)
- Constellation: Pisces
- Right ascension: 01^{h} 23.7^{m} 00^{s}
- Declination: +33° 15′ 00″
- Redshift: 0.0165
- Heliocentric radial velocity: 4934 +/- 7 km/s
- Galactocentric velocity: 5079 +/- 9 km/s
- Distance: 227 million light years away
- Apparent magnitude (V): 11.3
- Apparent magnitude (B): 12.3

Characteristics
- Type: SA0^{0}(r)
- Apparent size (V): 2.5' x 2.5'

Other designations
- Arp 229, CGCG 502-67, MCG 5-4-44, PGC 5098, UGC 938, V V 207

NGC 507, also known as Arp 229, CGCG 502-67, MCG 5-4-44, PGC 5098, UGC 938, and V V 207, is a lenticular galaxy in the constellation Pisces. It was described as being "very faint", "pretty large", "round", "brighter in the middle", and "south of NGC 508" by John Dreyer in the New General Catalogue. The two galaxies (NGC 507 and NGC 508) are a part of the Atlas of Peculiar Galaxies, where NGC 507 is described as "Circular or near circular rings of small density difference."

It was discovered by William Herschel on September 12, 1784.

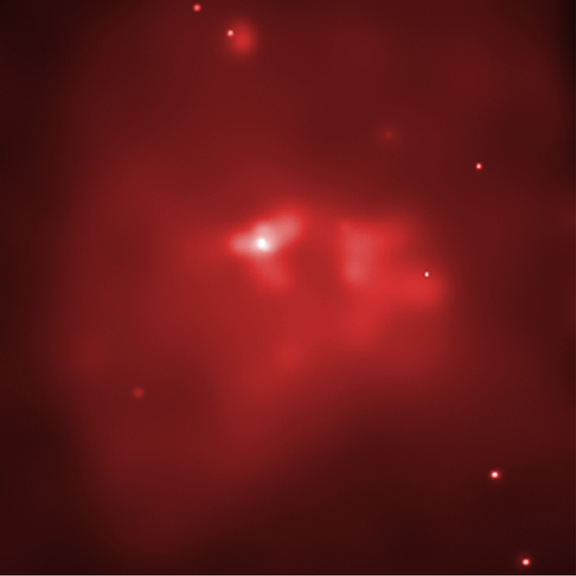
This image shows a vast cloud of hot gas (X-ray/red), surrounding high-energy bubbles (radio/blue) on either side of the bright white area around the supermassive black hole at the center of the galaxy.

== See also ==
- Lenticular galaxy
- List of NGC objects (1–1000)
- Pisces (constellation)
