= Recessional velocity =

Rate at which an astronomical object moves away from an observer

Recessional velocity is the rate at which an extragalactic astronomical object recedes (becomes more distant) from an observer as a result of the expansion of the universe. It can be measured by observing the wavelength shifts of spectral lines emitted by the object, known as the object's cosmological redshift.

== Application to cosmology ==
Hubble's law is the relationship between a galaxy's distance and its recessional velocity, which is approximately linear for galaxies at distances of up to a few hundred megaparsecs. It can be expressed as

$$v_r = H_0 D\ + v_{pec}$$

where $H_0$ is the Hubble constant, $D$ is the proper distance, $v_r$ is the object's recessional velocity, and $v_{pec}$ is the object's peculiar velocity.

The recessional velocity of a galaxy can be calculated from the redshift observed in its emitted spectrum. One application of Hubble's law is to estimate distances to galaxies based on measurements of their recessional velocities. However, for relatively nearby galaxies the peculiar velocity can be comparable to or larger than the recessional velocity, in which case Hubble's law does not give a good estimate of an object's distance based on its redshift. In some cases (such as the Andromeda Galaxy, 2.5 million light-years away and approaching us at 300 km/s, or even Messier 81 at 12 million light-years away and approaching at 34 km/s) $v_r$ is negative (i.e., the galaxy's spectrum is observed to be blueshifted) as a result of the peculiar velocity.
