= Catalogue of Nebulae and Clusters of Stars =

Astronomical catalogue

The Catalogue of Nebulae and Clusters of Stars (CN) is an astronomical catalogue of nebulae first published in 1786 by William Herschel, with the assistance of his sister Caroline Herschel. It was later expanded into the General Catalogue of Nebulae and Clusters of Stars (GC) by his son, John Herschel, in 1864. The CN and GC are the precursors to John Louis Emil Dreyer's New General Catalogue (NGC), compiled in 1888 and used by current astronomers.

== History ==
The Catalogue of Nebulae and Clusters of Stars was first published in 1786 by William Herschel in the Philosophical Transactions of the Royal Society of London. In 1789, he added another 1,000 entries, and finally another 500 in 1802, bringing the total to 2,500 entries. This catalogue originated the usage of letters and catalogue numbers as identifiers. The capital "H" followed with the catalogue entry number represented the item.

In 1864, the CN was expanded into the General Catalogue of Nebulae and Clusters of Stars (GC) by John Herschel (William's son). The GC contained 5,079 entries. Later, a complementary edition of the catalog was published posthumously as the General Catalogue of 10,300 Multiple and Double Stars. The small "h" followed with the catalogue entry number represented the item.

In 1878, John Louis Emil Dreyer published a supplement to the General Catalogue. In 1886, he suggested building a second supplement to the General Catalogue, but the Royal Astronomical Society asked Dreyer to compile a new version instead. This led to the publication of the New General Catalogue (NGC) in 1888, and its two expansions, the Index Catalogues (IC), in 1895 and 1908.

== See also ==
- Herschel 400 Catalogue
- Category:NGC objects
- Category:IC objects
