= Hickson 44 =

Group of galaxies in the constellation Leo

HCG 44
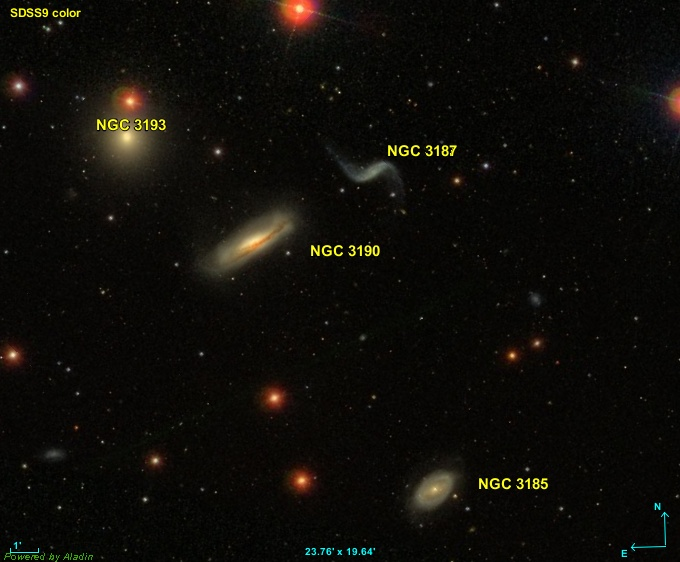
- Galaxy Group HCG 44 imaged by SDSS

Observation data (Epoch )
- Constellation: Leo
- Right ascension: 10^{h} 18^{m} 02s^{s}
- Declination: 21° 49′
- Number of galaxies: 4
- Distance: 80 million
- Notable features: NGC 3190

Other designations
- HCG 044; RSCG 35; USGC U291; ARP 316; [RPG97] 080

Hickson Compact Group 44 (HCG 44) is a group of galaxies in the constellation Leo It is situated around 80 million light years from Earth. Also a part of this galaxy group is a galaxy group in Halton Arp's book called Atlas of peculiar galaxies, and this galaxy group is designated as Arp 316.

== Nearby Galaxies and Environment ==
HCG 44 is part of a Galaxy group known as LGG 194. It consists of at least 13 members, which are NGC 3162, NGC 3185, NGC 3177, NGC 3193, NGC 3187, NGC 3213, NGC 3226, NGC 3226, NGC 3227, NGC 3287, NGC 3301 and NGC 3190

In the surrounding field of HCG 44, there are several galaxies at similar velocities and distances, which are Emission-Line galaxy UGC 5629 (1238 km s⁻¹, 22.98 Mpc), HII galaxies LEDA 30133 (1178 km s⁻¹, 21.98 Mpc) and IC 610 (1168 km s⁻¹, 21.99 Mpc), a Quasar UGC 5575 (1471 km s⁻¹, 26.33 Mpc), Low Surface Brightness Galaxy UGC 5524 (1636 km s⁻¹, 28.75 Mpc), Emission-line galaxy LEDA 30133 (1082 km s⁻¹).

== Members ==
Members of the HCG 44
Name	Type	R.A. (J2000)	Dec. (J2000)	Redshift (z)	Apparent Magnitude
NGC 3185	(R)SB(r)a	10^{h} 17^{m} 38.584^{s}	+21° 41′ 17.82″	0.004060	12.17
NGC 3187	SB(s)c	10^{h} 17^{m} 47.865^{s}	+21° 52′ 24.00″	0.005274	12.77
NGC 3190	SA(s)0−	10^{h} 18^{m} 05.6^{s}	+21° 49′ 58″	0.004240	11.1
NGC 3193	SA(s)0−	10^{h} 18^{m} 24.9^{s}	+21° 53′ 4″	0.004607	10.81
