= NGC 3190 =

Galaxy in the constellation Leo

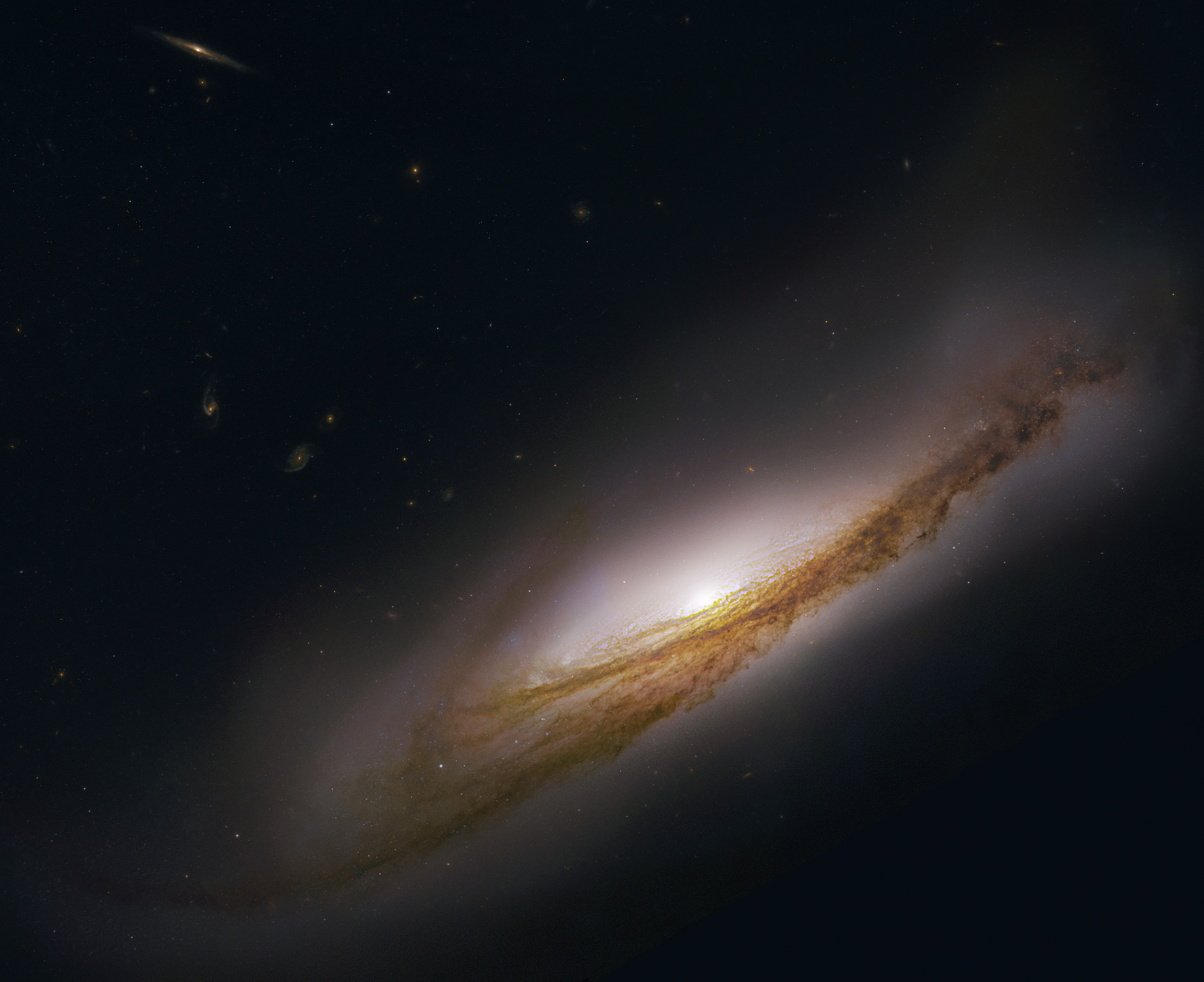
- NGC 3190 imaged by the Hubble Space Telescope

Observation data (J2000 epoch)
- Constellation: Leo
- Right ascension: 10^{h} 18^{m} 05.6341^{s}
- Declination: +21° 49′ 56.011″
- Redshift: 0.004370
- Heliocentric radial velocity: 1,310±4 km/s
- Distance: 79 ± 7 Mly (24.2 ± 2.1 Mpc)
- Apparent magnitude (V): 11.1

Characteristics
- Type: SA(s)0^{−}
- Apparent size (V): 4.4 × 1.5

Other designations
- HOLM 175A, HCG 044A, NGC 3189, IRAS 10153+2204, Arp 316, UGC 5559, MCG +04-24-026, PGC 30083, CGCG 123-037, VV 307a

NGC 3190 (also known as NGC 3189) is a spiral galaxy with tightly wound arms and lying in the constellation Leo. It was discovered by William Herschel in 1784. NGC 3190 is member of Hickson 44 galaxy group, estimated at around 80 million light years away, and consisting of four galaxies in a tight group - NGC 3193 is fairly featureless, NGC 3187 is a dim but striking spiral galaxy and NGC 3185 has a barred spiral structure with an outer ring.

It is also a member of the NGC 3190 Group of galaxies, which is a member of the Leo II Groups, a series of galaxies and galaxy clusters strung out from the right edge of the Virgo Supercluster. NGC 3190 is also in a galaxy group known as LGG 194. It consists of at least 13 members, which are NGC 3162, NGC 3185, NGC 3177, NGC 3193, NGC 3187, NGC 3213, NGC 3226, NGC 3226, NGC 3227, NGC 3287 and NGC 3301.

In 2012, Apple used a blue tinted image of NGC 3190 as the default desktop wallpaper for the release of OS X Mountain Lion.

== Supernovae ==
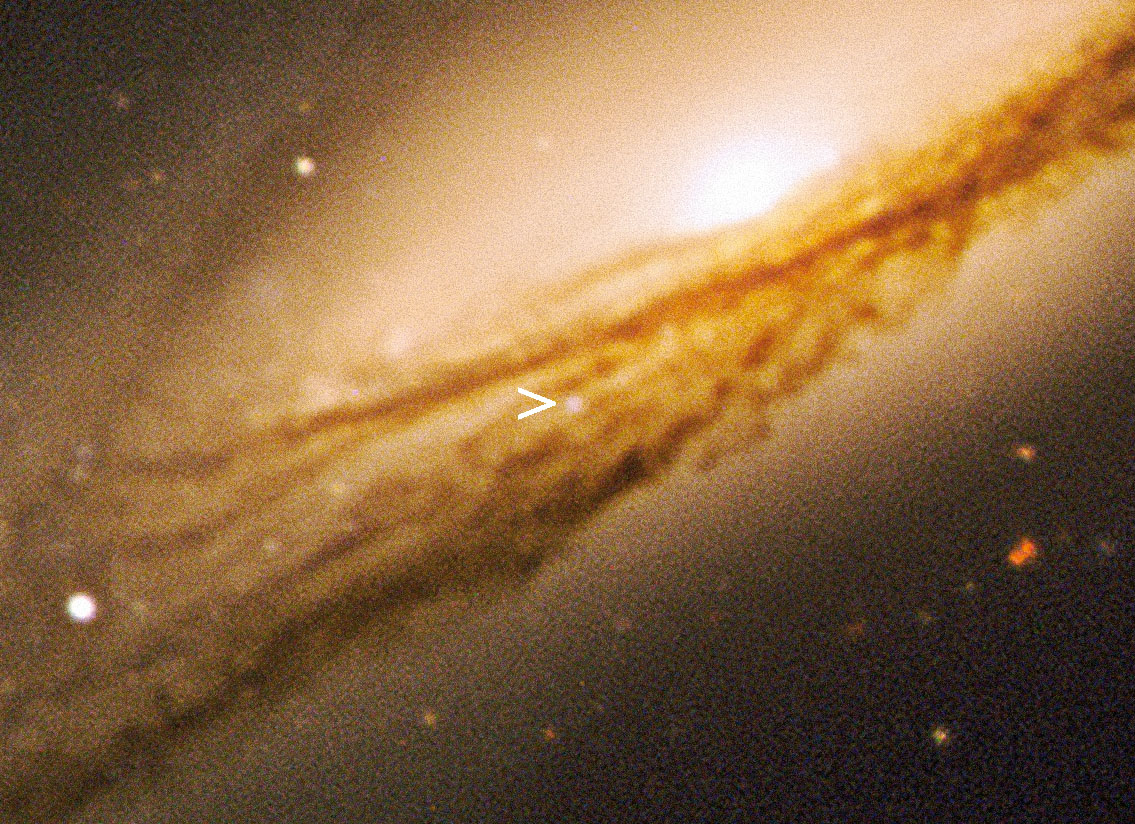
Supernova 2002bo in March 2003

Two supernovae have been observed in NGC 3190:

- SN 2002bo (Type Ia, mag. 15.5) was co-discovered by Paulo Cacella and Yoji Hirose on 9 March 2002.
- SN 2002cv (Type Ia-pec, mag. 19) was discovered by the Campo Imperatore Observatory on 9 May 2002. This Italian team detected the supernova while studying SN 2002bo, and both of these were visible at the same time.

== Image Gallery ==
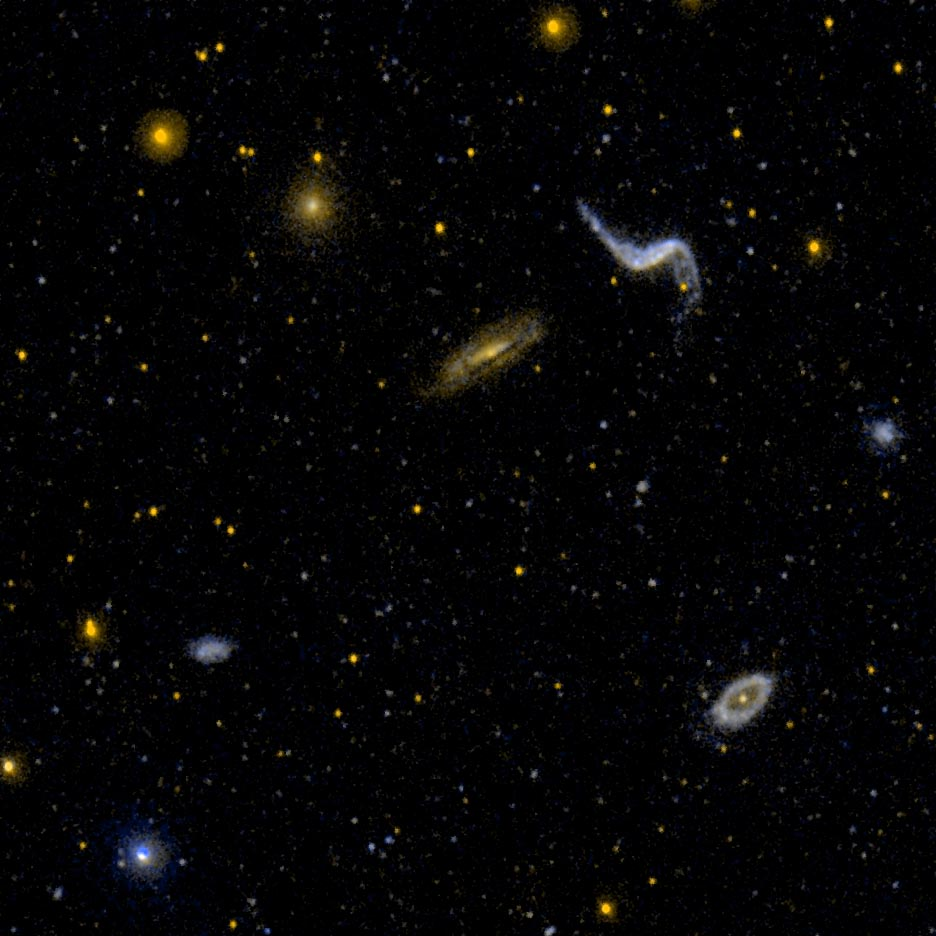
NGC 3190 near center and other galaxies

== See also ==
- Hickson Compact Group
