= NGC 3177 =

Spiral galaxy in the constellation Leo

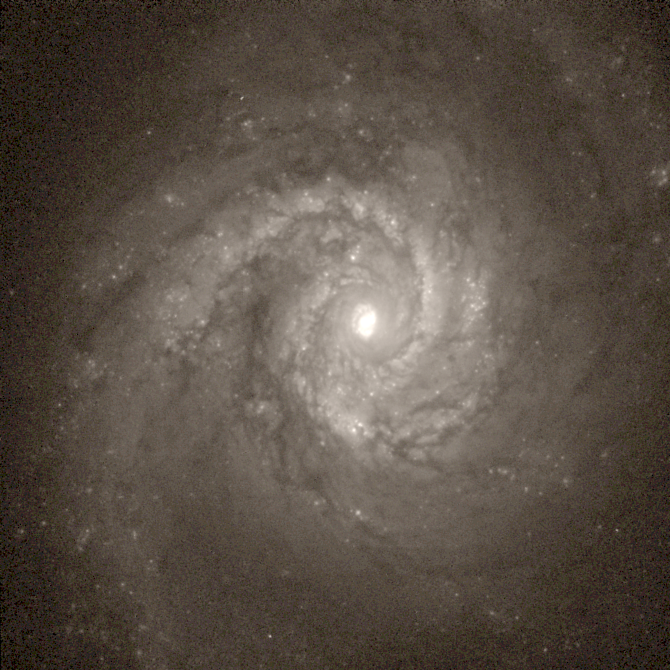
- NGC 3177, as imaged by the Hubble Space Telescope

Observation data (J2000 epoch)
- Constellation: Leo
- Right ascension: 10h 16m 33s
- Declination: +21° 07′ 23″
- Apparent magnitude (V): 11.6
- Apparent magnitude (B): 12.8
- Surface brightness: 22.34 mag/arcsec^2

Characteristics
- Type: SA(rs)b
- Apparent size (V): 1.6′ × 1.3′

Other designations
- UGC 05544, MRK 9018, CGCG 123-032, MCG +04-24-023, IRAS 10138+2122, PGC 030010

NGC 3177 is a spiral galaxy located in the constellation Leo. Its speed relative to the cosmic microwave background is 1,627 ± 22 km/s, which corresponds to a Hubble distance of 24.0 ± 1.7 Mpc (~78.3 million ly). NGC 3177 was discovered by the German-British astronomer William Herschel in 1784.

The luminosity class of NGC 3177 is II and it has a broad HI line. It also contains regions of ionized hydrogen. According to the SIMBAD database, NGC 3177 has an active galactic nucleus.

To date, nine non-redshift measurements yield a distance of 27.722 ± 4.581 Mpc (~90.4 million ly), which is within the distance values of Hubble.

== Supernovae ==
The supernova SN 1947A was discovered in NGC 3177 on March 5, 1947, by Edwin Hubble. The type of this supernova has not been determined.

== NGC 3227 group ==
NGC 3177 is part of the NGC 3227 group. In addition to NGC 3177 and NGC 3227, this group includes at least 16 other galaxies including NGC 3162, NGC 3185, NGC 3187, NGC 3190, NGC 3193, NGC 3213, NGC 3226, NGC 3227, NGC 3287 and NGC 3301.

== See also ==
- List of spiral galaxies
