= NGC 3193 =

Galaxy in the constellation Leo

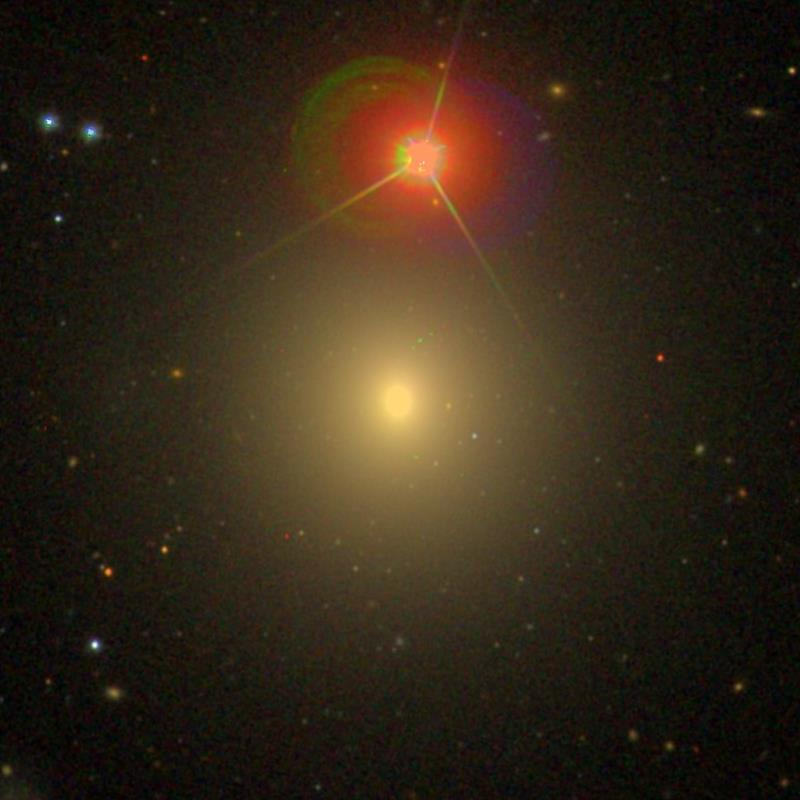
- NGC 3193 by Sloan Digital Sky Survey

Observation data (J2000 epoch)
- Constellation: Leo
- Right ascension: 10^{h} 18^{m} 24.9^{s}
- Declination: 21° 53′ 38″
- Redshift: 0.004607±0.000017
- Heliocentric radial velocity: 1,381±5 km/s km/s
- Distance: 92 ± 27 Mly (28.2 ± 8.3 Mpc)
- Apparent magnitude (V): 10.9

Characteristics
- Type: E2
- Apparent size (V): 2.0′ × 2.0′
- Notable features: Member of HCG 44

Other designations
- NGC 3193, Arp 316, UGC 5562, MCG +04-24-027, PGC 30099

NGC 3193 is an elliptical galaxy in the constellation Leo. The galaxy lies about 90 million light years away from Earth, which means, given its apparent dimensions, that NGC 3193 is approximately 80,000 light years across. It was discovered by William Herschel on March 12, 1784.

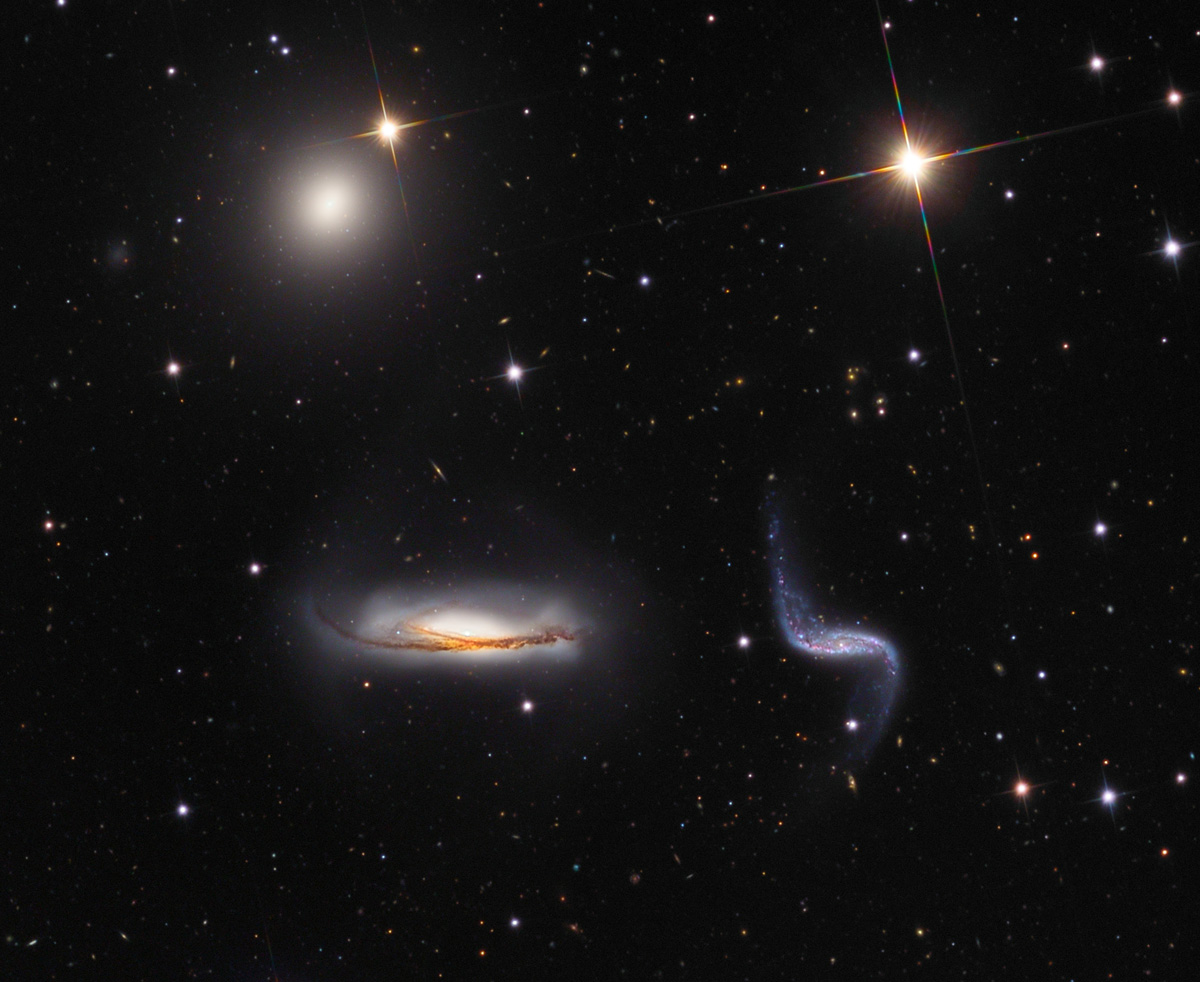
HCG 44 compact group, NGC 3193 is visible to the top left

NGC 3193 lies at the north-east edge of the galaxy compact group HCG 44, which also includes the spiral galaxies NGC 3185, NGC 3187 and NGC 3190. HCG 44 is considered to be part of a larger galaxy group known as LGG 194, which also includes the galaxies NGC 3162, NGC 3177, NGC 3213, NGC 3226, NGC 3227, NGC 3287, and NGC 3301. It is a member of the Leo II Groups, part of the Virgo Supercluster. NGC 3193 has similar radial velocity with NGC 3187 and NGC 3190, however redshift independent distances put NGC 3193 at a greater distance than the rest of the group, although these measurements have large error margins.

A long tail of hydrogen has been found north of NGC 3193 and two smaller hydrogen clouds lie southeast of the galaxy. A dwarf spheroidal galaxy has been detected in the halo of NGC 3193.
