= NGC 3185 =

Galaxy in the constellation Leo

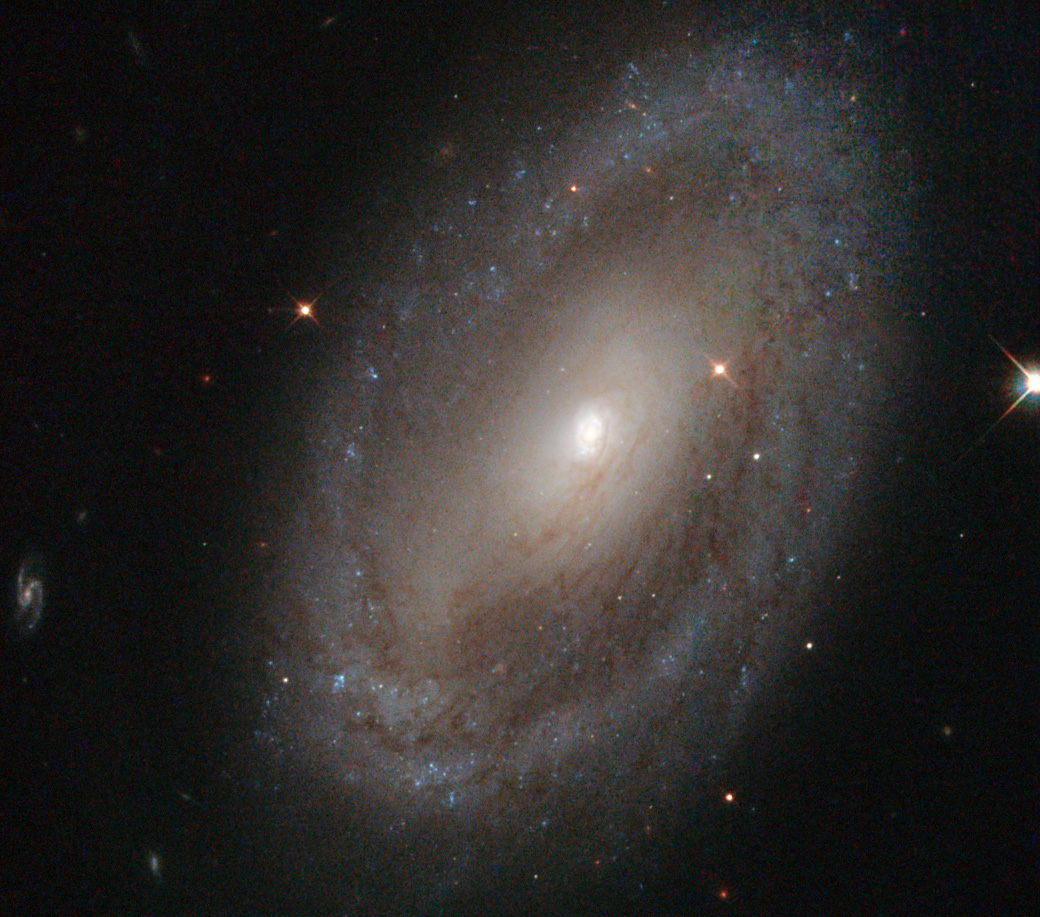
- NGC 3185, imaged by the Hubble Space Telescope

Observation data (J2000 epoch)
- Constellation: Leo
- Right ascension: 10^{h} 17^{m} 38.584^{s}
- Declination: +21° 41′ 17.82″
- Redshift: 0.004060
- Heliocentric radial velocity: 1217
- Distance: 74.62 ± 16.07 Mly (22.879 ± 4.928 Mpc)
- Group or cluster: HCG 44
- Apparent magnitude (V): 12.17
- Apparent magnitude (B): 12.99
- Magnitude (J): 10.068
- Magnitude (H): 9.415
- Magnitude (K): 9.145

Characteristics
- Type: (R)SB(r)a
- Apparent size (V): 2.373′ × 1.234′

Other designations
- NGC 3185, UGC 5554, MCG+04-24-024, HCG 44c, PGC 30059

NGC 3185 is a spiral galaxy located 20.4 Mpc away in the constellation Leo. NGC 3185 is a member of a four-galaxy group called HCG 44. It is also a member of the NGC 3190 Group of galaxies, which is a member of the Leo II Groups, a series of galaxies and galaxy clusters strung out from the right edge of the Virgo Supercluster. NGC 3185 is known to host an Seyfert 2 Nucleus.

NGC 3185 is also known to be in a galaxy group LGG 194. It consists of at least 13 members, which are NGC 3162, NGC 3185, NGC 3177, NGC 3193, NGC 3187, NGC 3213, NGC 3226, NGC 3226, NGC 3227, NGC 3287, NGC 3301 and NGC 3190
