= UGC 4653 =

Trio of interacting galaxies in the constellation Lynx

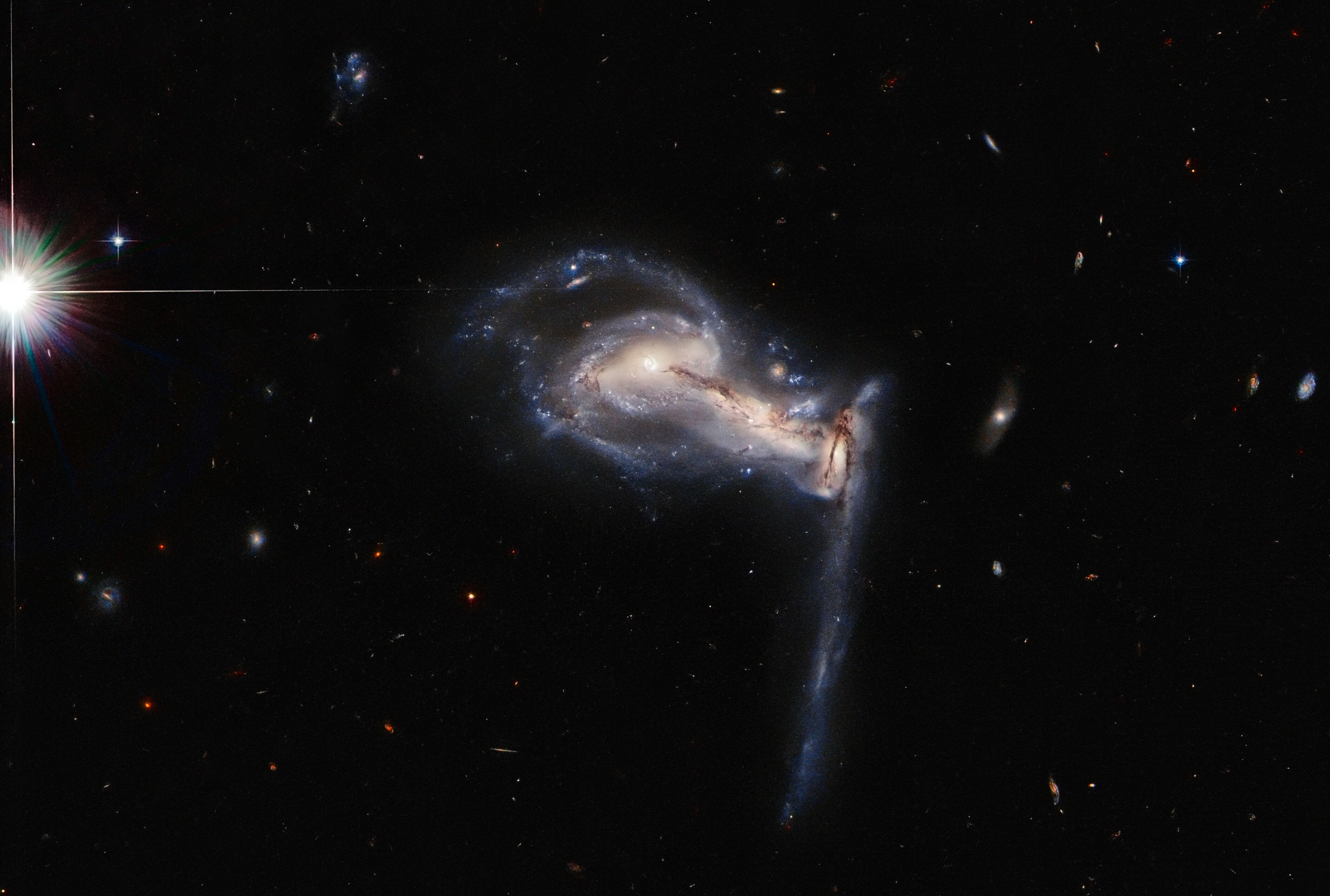
- Hubble Space Telescope image of UGC 4653

Observation data (J2000 epoch)
- Constellation: Lynx
- Right ascension: 08^{h} 53^{m} 54.6^{s}
- Declination: +35° 09′ 00″
- Redshift: 0.056836
- Heliocentric radial velocity: 16,748 km/s
- Distance: 763 Mly (233.9 Mpc)
- Apparent magnitude (V): 0.093
- Apparent magnitude (B): 0.124

Characteristics
- Type: SB(s)b
- Size: ~440,000 ly (135 kpc) (estimated)
- Apparent size (V): 1.9' x 1.1'
- Notable features: Interacting galaxy

Other designations
- PGC 24981, SDSS J085354.62+350844.0, 2MASX J08535462+3508439, Arp 195, LEDA 24981, MCG+06-20-012, VV 243

UGC 4653 known as Arp 195, is a trio of interacting galaxies located 763 million light-years away from the Solar System in the constellation Lynx. The galaxies are being distorted through gravitational interactions with each other. The first known reference for this object, was in 1959 where B.A. Vorontsov-Vel'yaminov compiled it inside the Vorontsov-Vel'yaminov Interacting galaxies, as VV 243.

This image of UGC 4653 was captured by the Hubble Space Telescope. The galaxies make up the 195th object in the Atlas of Peculiar Galaxies created by Halton Arp. They fall into the category of galaxies with material ejected from nuclei.

UGC 4653 has active nuclear regions which produce infrared (IR) emissions. These appear to be more like AGNs than HII regions.

A study published in 2023, confirmed all three galaxies of the UGC 4653 system are spirals. The southern galaxy is a face-on galaxy hosting a bright core, while the central is edge-on but no clear distinction whether it is an early or late-type galaxy. The northern galaxy has a tidal tail and is of late-type morphology. With the exception of the third, both galaxies contain presence of strong emission lines.

== Supernova ==
Type Ia supernova, SN 2008bv was discovered in UGC 4653 with a magnitude of 18.3. It was located 1".7 east and 3".9 south of the nucleus.
