= NGC 5185 =

Galaxy in the constellation Virgo

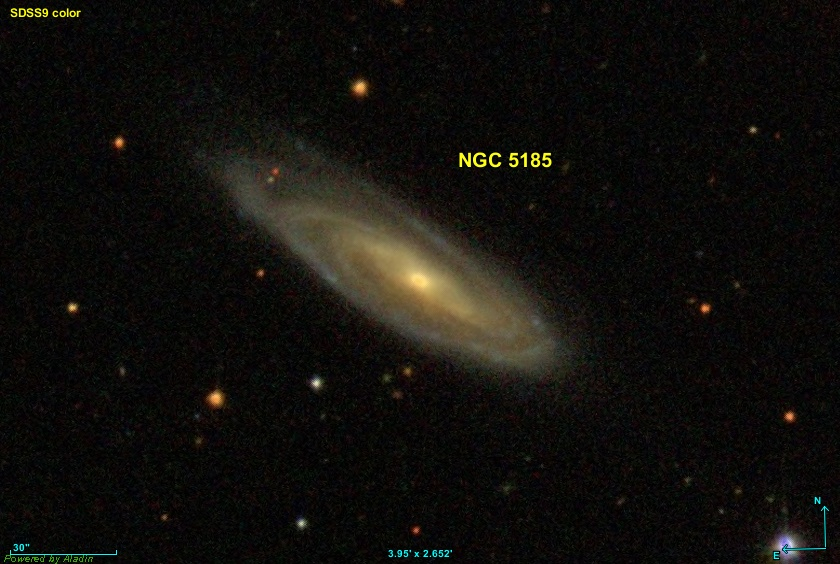
- NGC 5185 imaged by SDSS

Observation data (J2000 epoch)
- Constellation: Virgo
- Right ascension: 13^{h} 30^{m} 02.2642^{s}
- Declination: +13° 24′ 57.757″
- Redshift: 0.024679±0.0000110
- Heliocentric radial velocity: 7,399±3 km/s
- Distance: 374.23 ± 10.11 Mly (114.738 ± 3.101 Mpc)
- Group or cluster: LDC 985
- Apparent magnitude (V): 14.3g

Characteristics
- Type: Sb
- Size: ~220,400 ly (67.59 kpc) (estimated)
- Apparent size (V): 0.88′ × 0.68′

Other designations
- IRAS F13276+1340, 2MASX J13300224+1324573, UGC 8488, MCG +02-34-025, PGC 47422, CGCG 072-104

NGC 5185 is a spiral galaxy in the constellation of Virgo. Its velocity with respect to the cosmic microwave background is 7,683±20 km/s, which corresponds to a Hubble distance of 369.6 ± 25.9 Mly (113.32 ± 7.94 Mpc). Additionally, 16 non-redshift measurements give a similar mean distance of 374.23 ± 10.11 Mly (114.738 ± 3.101 Mpc). It was discovered by German-British astronomer William Herschel on 19 March 1787.

NGC 5185 is a Seyfert II galaxy, i.e. it has a quasar-like nucleus with very high surface brightnesses whose spectra reveal strong, high-ionisation emission lines, but unlike quasars, the host galaxy is clearly detectable.

== LDC 985 Group ==
NGC 5185 is a member of a group of galaxies known as LDC 985. The other five galaxies in the group are NGC 5181, NGC 5207, NGC 5221, NGC 5222, NGC 5230.

== Supernovae ==
Three supernovae have been observed in NGC 5185:

- SN 2006br (Type Ia, mag. 17.8) was discovered by Tim Puckett and G. Sostero on 25 April 2006.
- SN 2006dz (type unknown, mag. 20.0) was discovered by the Carnegie Supernova Project on 31 May 2006.
- SN 2021gvm (Type II, mag. 19.5747) was discovered by the Zwicky Transient Facility on 21 March 2021.

== See also ==
- List of NGC objects (5001–6000)
