= NGC 5615 =

Galaxy in the constellation Boötes

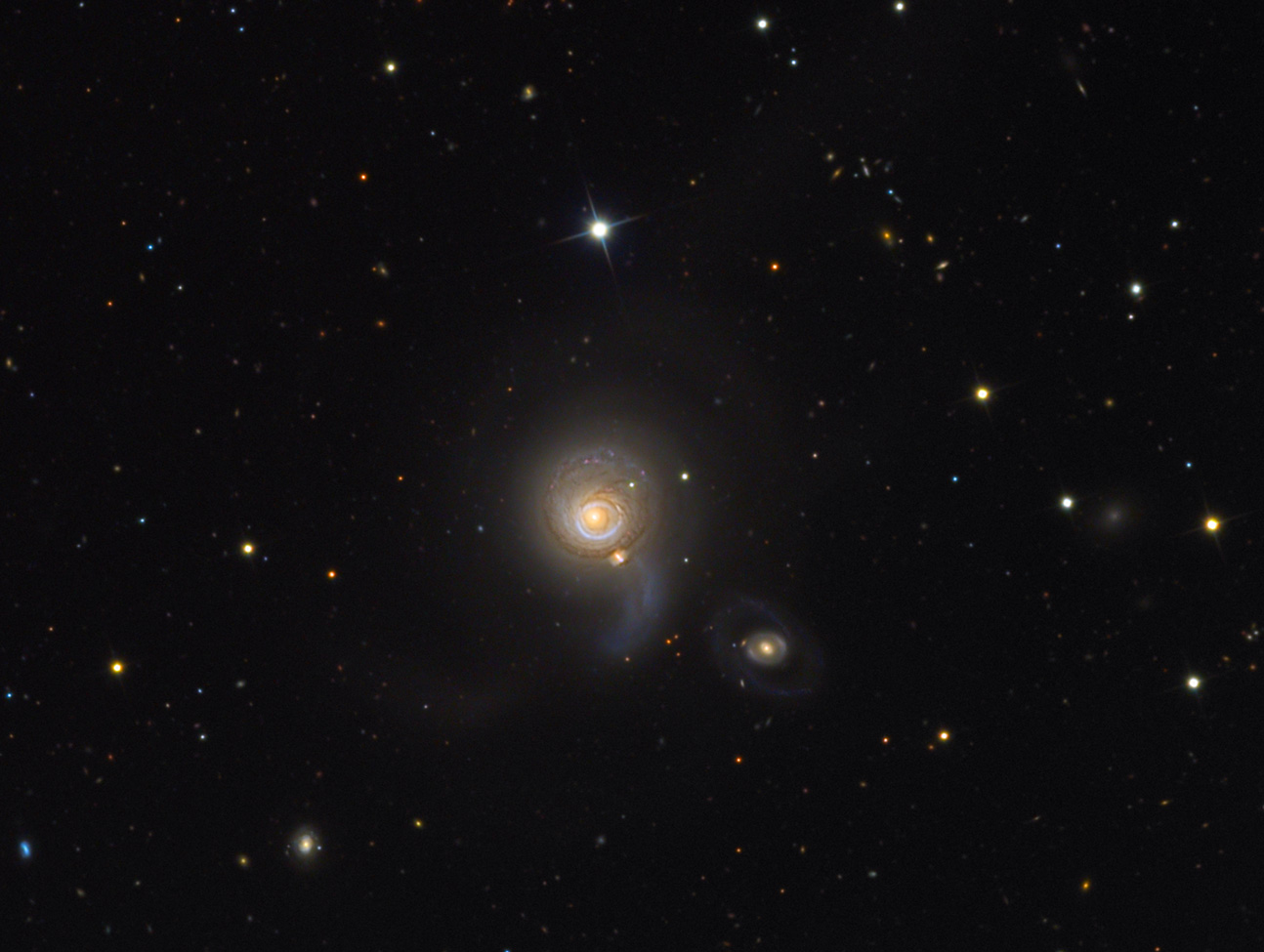
- NGC 5615, (bright knot in outer ring of biggest galaxy), NGC 5613, and NGC 5614 as imaged at the Mount Lemmon SkyCenter

Observation data (J2000 epoch)
- Constellation: Boötes
- Right ascension: 14^{h} 24^{m} 06.4^{s}
- Declination: +34° 51′ 54″
- Redshift: 0.013151 ± 0.000085 (3,953 km/s)
- Distance: 180 ± 13 Mly (55.1 ± 3.9 Mpc)
- Apparent magnitude (V): 17.8

Characteristics
- Type: Ir
- Apparent size (V): 0.10′ × 0.09′
- Notable features: NGC 5615 superimposed, tidal plumes, paired with NGC 5613.

Other designations
- GC 3883, LGG 380-004, MCG+06-32-023, PGC 51435, VV 77b

NGC 5615 is an irregular galaxy in the constellation Boötes. It is part of the Arp 178 triplet of interacting galaxies with NGC 5614 and NGC 5613. NGC 5615 forms a knot on the outer ring of NGC 5614, with a plume leading away from the knot.
