= NGC 5597 =

Galaxy in the constellation Libra

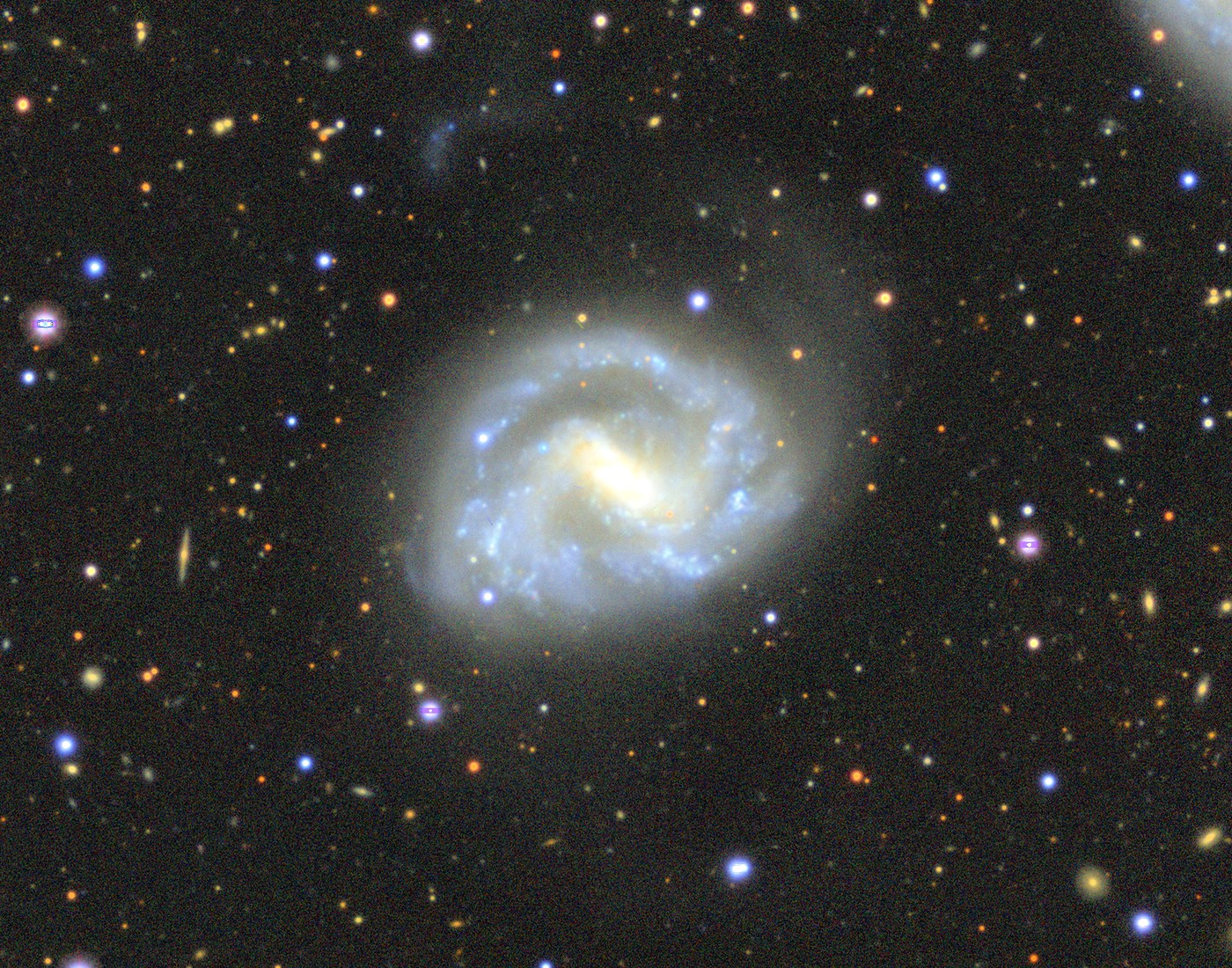
- NGC 5597 imaged by Legacy Surveys

Observation data (J2000 epoch)
- Constellation: Libra
- Right ascension: 14^{h} 24^{m} 27.4115^{s}
- Declination: −16° 45′ 46.598″
- Redshift: 0.009030±0.0000170
- Heliocentric radial velocity: 2,707±5 km/s
- Distance: 125.90 Mly (38.600 Mpc)
- Group or cluster: HOLM 638, VV 446
- Apparent magnitude (V): 12.60

Characteristics
- Type: SAB(s)cd
- Size: ~83,900 ly (25.73 kpc) (estimated)
- Apparent size (V): 2.1′ × 1.7′

Other designations
- HOLM 638B, IRAS 14216-1632, 2MASX J14242744-1645457, MCG -03-37-002, PGC 51456, VV 446 NED02

NGC 5597 is an intermediate spiral galaxy in the constellation of Libra. Its velocity with respect to the cosmic microwave background is 2,956±18 km/s, which corresponds to a Hubble distance of 142.2 ± 10.0 Mly (43.59 ± 3.06 Mpc). However, one non-redshift measurement gives a much closer distance estimate of 125.90 Mly (38.600 Mpc). It was discovered by German-British astronomer William Herschel on 14 May 1784.

NGC 5597 is a Seyfert I galaxy, i.e. it has a quasar-like nucleus with very high surface brightnesses whose spectra reveal strong, high-ionisation emission lines, but unlike quasars, the host galaxy is clearly detectable.

== Pair of galaxies ==
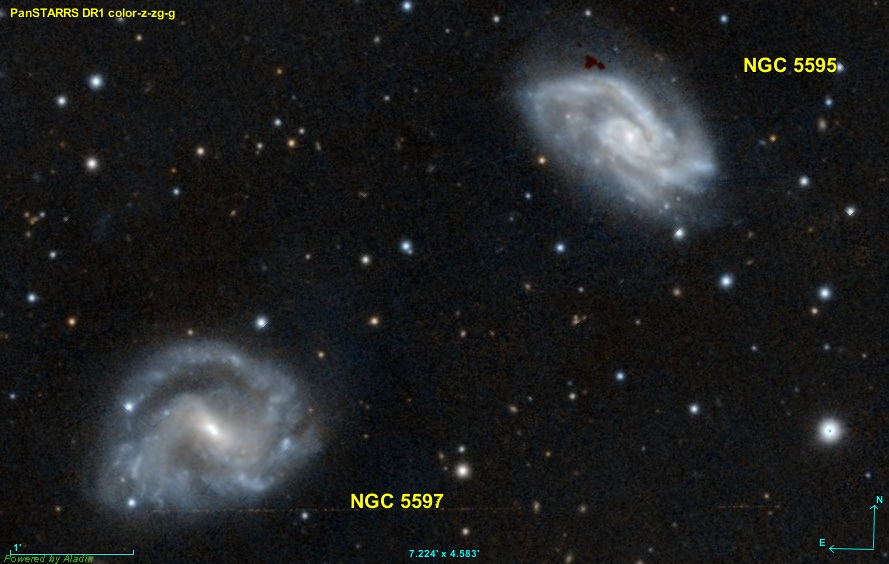
NGC 5595 (upper right) and NGC 5597 (lower left) imaged by Pan-STARRS

NGC 5597 and NGC 5595 are listed together as Holm 638 in Erik Holmberg's A Study of Double and Multiple Galaxies Together with Inquiries into some General Metagalactic Problems, published in 1937. The two galaxies are also listed together as VV 446 in part II of the Atlas and Catalogue of Interacting Galaxies.

== Supernovae ==
Two supernovae have been observed in NGC 5597:

- SN 1981E (Type II, mag. 17) was discovered by Marina Wischnjewsky on 29 May 1981.
- SN 2012es (Type IIb, mag. 16.3) was discovered by Berto Monard on 12 August 2012.

== See also ==
- List of NGC objects (5001–6000)
