= NGC 965 =

Spiral galaxy in the constellation Cetus

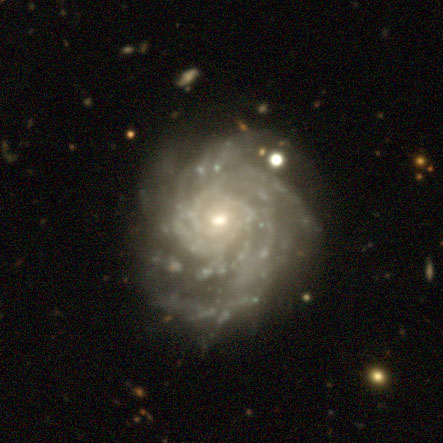
- DECam image of NGC 965

Observation data (J2000.0 epoch)
- Constellation: Cetus
- Right ascension: 02^{h} 32^{m} 25.10^{s}
- Declination: −18° 38′ 22.99″
- Redshift: 0.022662
- Heliocentric radial velocity: 6794 ± 39 km/s
- Distance: 294 Mly
- Apparent magnitude (V): 14.20
- Apparent magnitude (B): 14.90

Characteristics
- Type: SB(s)cd
- Apparent size (V): 1.0 x 0.8

Other designations
- PGC 9666, MCG -3-7-31, ESO 545-32

NGC 965 is a spiral galaxy approximately 294 million light-years away from Earth in the constellation of Cetus. It was discovered by American astronomer Ormond Stone in 1886 with the 26" refractor at Leander McCormick Observatory.

Soviet/Russian astrophysicist Vorontsov-Velyaminov B. and Arhipova V. P. have noted in their "Morphological Catalogue of Galaxies" that NGC 965 "looks almost like two flattened galaxies i=I and i=III in contact and very disturbed".

== See also ==
- List of NGC objects (1–1000)
