= NGC 230 =

Spiral galaxy in the constellation Cetus

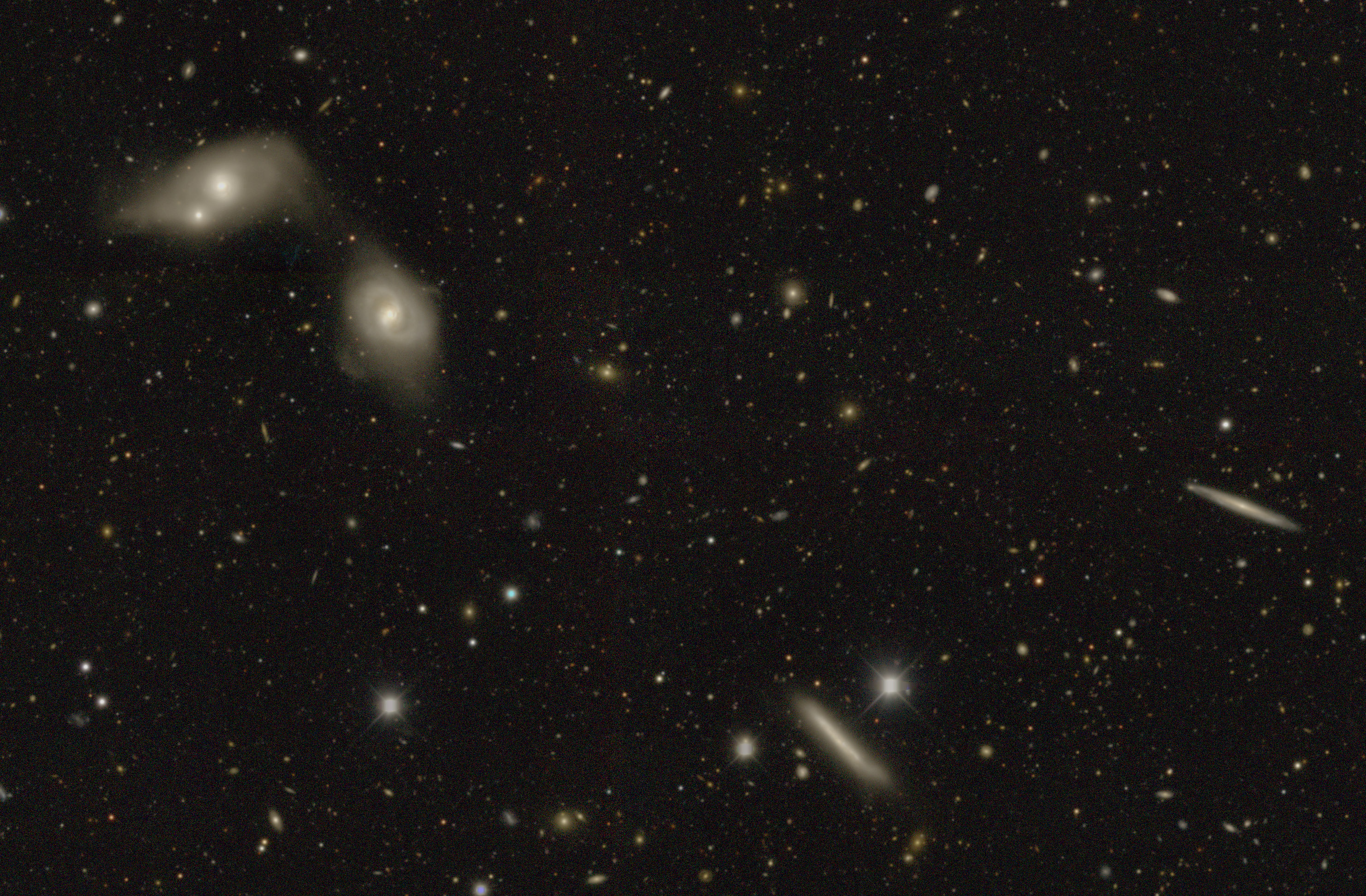
- NGC 230 is the galaxy at the middle bottom. NGC 232 and 235 are at the upper left and IC 1573 is on the right.

Observation data (J2000 epoch)
- Constellation: Cetus
- Right ascension: 00^{h} 42^{m} 27.2^{s}
- Declination: −23° 37′ 44″
- Redshift: 0.022546
- Apparent magnitude (V): 15.36

Characteristics
- Type: Sa
- Apparent size (V): 1.1' × 0.2'

Other designations
- ESO 474- G 014, MCG -04-02-037, 2MASX J00422719-2337436, IRAS 00399-2354, ESO-LV 4740140, PGC 2539.

NGC 230 is a spiral galaxy located in the constellation Cetus. It was discovered in 1886 by Francis Leavenworth.
