= 3C 120 =

Galaxy in the constellation Taurus

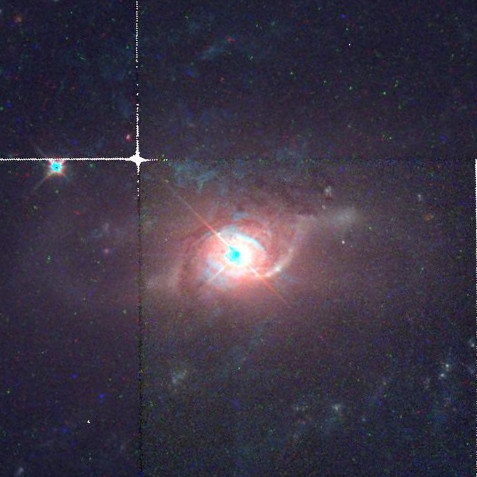
- Image of 3C 120 by the Hubble Space Telescope

Observation data (J2000 epoch)
- Constellation: Taurus
- Right ascension: 04^{h} 33^{m} 11.1^{s}
- Declination: +05° 21′ 16″
- Redshift: 0.033010 ± 0.000030
- Heliocentric radial velocity: 9,896 ± 9 km/s
- Distance: 419 Mly
- Apparent magnitude (V): 14.1

Characteristics
- Type: S0
- Apparent size (V): 0.8′ × 0.6′
- Notable features: active galactic nucleus

Other designations
- BW Tauri, UGC 3087, Mrk 1506, II Zw 014, MCG +01-12-009, 4C +05.20, PGC 15504

3C 120, also known as Markarian 1506, is an active galaxy located in the constellation of Taurus, at a distance of about 420 million light years. It has been categorised as a type I Seyfert galaxy and a broad-line radio galaxy. 3C 120 has been found to be a variable source in all wavelengths and hosts a superluminal jet.

== Observational history ==
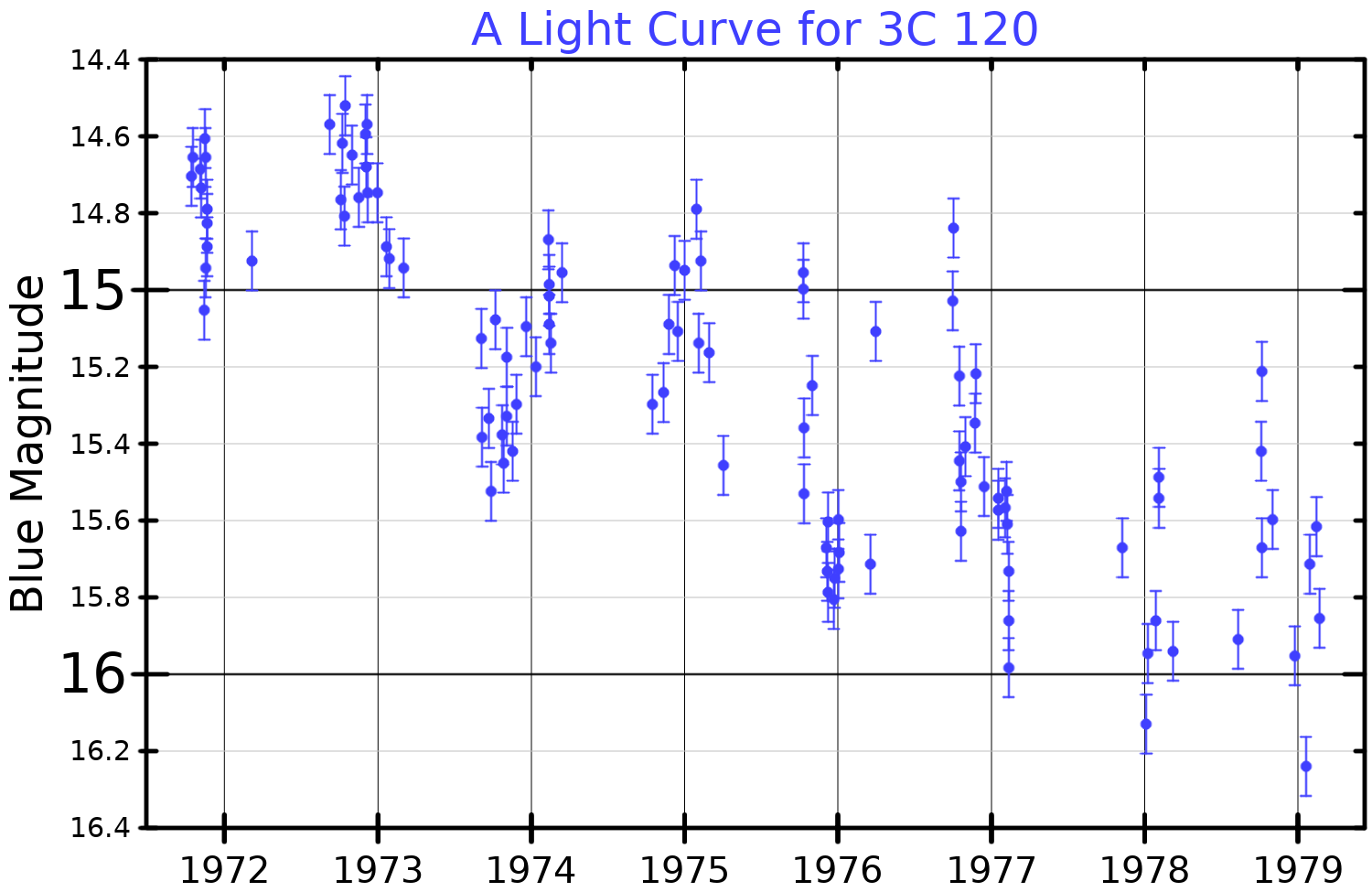
A light curve for 3C 120, adapted from Pollock et al. (1979)

The galaxy was discovered in 1940 by Harlow Shapley and C. M. Hanley to be a variable in visual light, with an apparent magnitude varying between 13.7 and 14.6 in irregular intervals, and was given the variable star designation BW Tauri. The radio emission of the galaxy was detected during the third radio research of Cambridge and was added in the Third Cambridge Catalogue of Radio Sources, published in 1959. The name signifies that it was the 120th object (ordered by right ascension) of the Catalog. The galaxy was catalogued as peculiar by Boris Vorontsov-Velyaminov and V. P. Arkhipova in the 1964 Morphological Catalogue of Galaxies.

Variability of 1.1 magnitudes in the ultraviolet was detected in observations obtained in 1974-1977 by the International Ultraviolet Explorer. In X-rays, changes in luminosity by a factor of 2.5 within days or months were detected by Einstein Observatory in 1979–1981, along with changes in spectral slope. Large variability in the infrared was detected in the 1970s. Superluminal motion in the radio jet was detected in observations between 1975 and 1977, along with flux variability.

== Characteristics ==
3C 120 is a lenticular galaxy with an extended structure that looks like spiral arms, while there is also emission extending southeast and northwest of the nucleus. In the optical images are visible extensive HII regions which are likely photoionised by the nucleus. Two shell structures are visible about one arcsecond from the bright nucleus. It has been suggested that photoionised nebulae are part of a tidal tail and the galaxy has undergone a galaxy merger. The star formation rate of 3C 120 is estimated to be about 2.8 solar masses per year.

It is a Fanaroff and Riley class I radio galaxy. The emission lines in the radiowaves are broad, and 3C 120 is the brightest broad-line radio galaxy.

=== Active nucleus ===
The nucleus of 3C 120 has been found to be active and it has been categorised as a type I Seyfert galaxy. The most accepted theory for the energy source of active galactic nuclei is the presence of an accretion disk around a supermassive black hole. The mass of the black hole in the centre of 3C 120 is estimated to be 6.3+0.5
−0.3×10^{7} M_{☉} based on reverberation mapping, or 2.29×10^{7} M_{☉} based on stellar velocity dispersion.

The X-ray emission is highly variable and it is characterised by a broken power law that agrees well with the expected values given the size of the black hole and its accretion rate. The X-ray spectrum also features a FeKα line. The emission is similar to that of radio quiet Seyfert galaxies, indicating that the X-rays are emitted by the accretion disk and its corona and not from the jet. The column density is estimated to be logNH= 20.67 ± 0.05 cm−2. Soft X-rays are emitted from hot gas that could originate from outflows or a superbubble.

The variations observed in X-Rays are also observed in optical wavelengths after 28 days. The variations are also observed at 37 GHz with a 20-day delay after the optical/UV ones. It has been suggested that 3C 120 exhibits quasi-periodic oscillation, with a period of about 1.65 days.

Gamma rays emission up to 10 GeV was detected by Fermi-LAT, which appears to variate in luminosity, with the flux doubling within a year, indicating a sustained rise in luminosity and not a flare as those observed in blazars.

=== Superluminal jet ===
3C 120 has been found when observed in radio waves to have a jet. The jet is one sided and its brightness decreases as it gets farther from the core in accordance with a simple power law. A bright knot is seen in the jet 4 arcseconds west of the core. After the knot the jet bends toward the northwest and one more knot is seen 20 arcseconds further west. X-ray emission has been associated with a radio knot about 25 arcseconds from the core. Another knot is seen 1.3 arcminutes from the core. After 3 arcminutes the jet appears broken and diffuse. A diffuse radio lobe without hot spots is visible southeast of the core. Radio emission from 3C 120 extends up to 14 arcminutes from the core.

Inside the jet there are knots that appear to move 4.1 to 5 times faster than the speed of light. The appearance of new bright knots in the jet has been found to happen after a decrease in X-ray emission, which indicates that the source of the radio jet is material from the inner part of the accretion disk falling into the black hole, with some passing through the event horizon while the rest is ejected into the jet. 3C 120 was the first AGN where this relation, previously only observed in microquasars, was established. The knots appear to fluctuate in brightness and polarisation changes direction, maybe due to the presence of a cloud about 8 parsec from the nucleus. A stationary feature has been observed at a distance of 1.3 parsecs from the source of the jet, and it has been found that when the knot passes from that point, an optical flare is observed. The angle between the line of sight and the axis of the jet is estimated to be between 10° and 20°.

A faint optical jet that is 15 arcseconds long has been observed which coincides with the radio jet. There appears to be a visual counterpart for the bright radio knot 4 arcseconds west of the nucleus but there is no clear visual counterpart of the other knots.

== See also ==
- 3C 390.3 - a similar radio galaxy
