= NGC 5613 =

Galaxy in the constellation Boötes

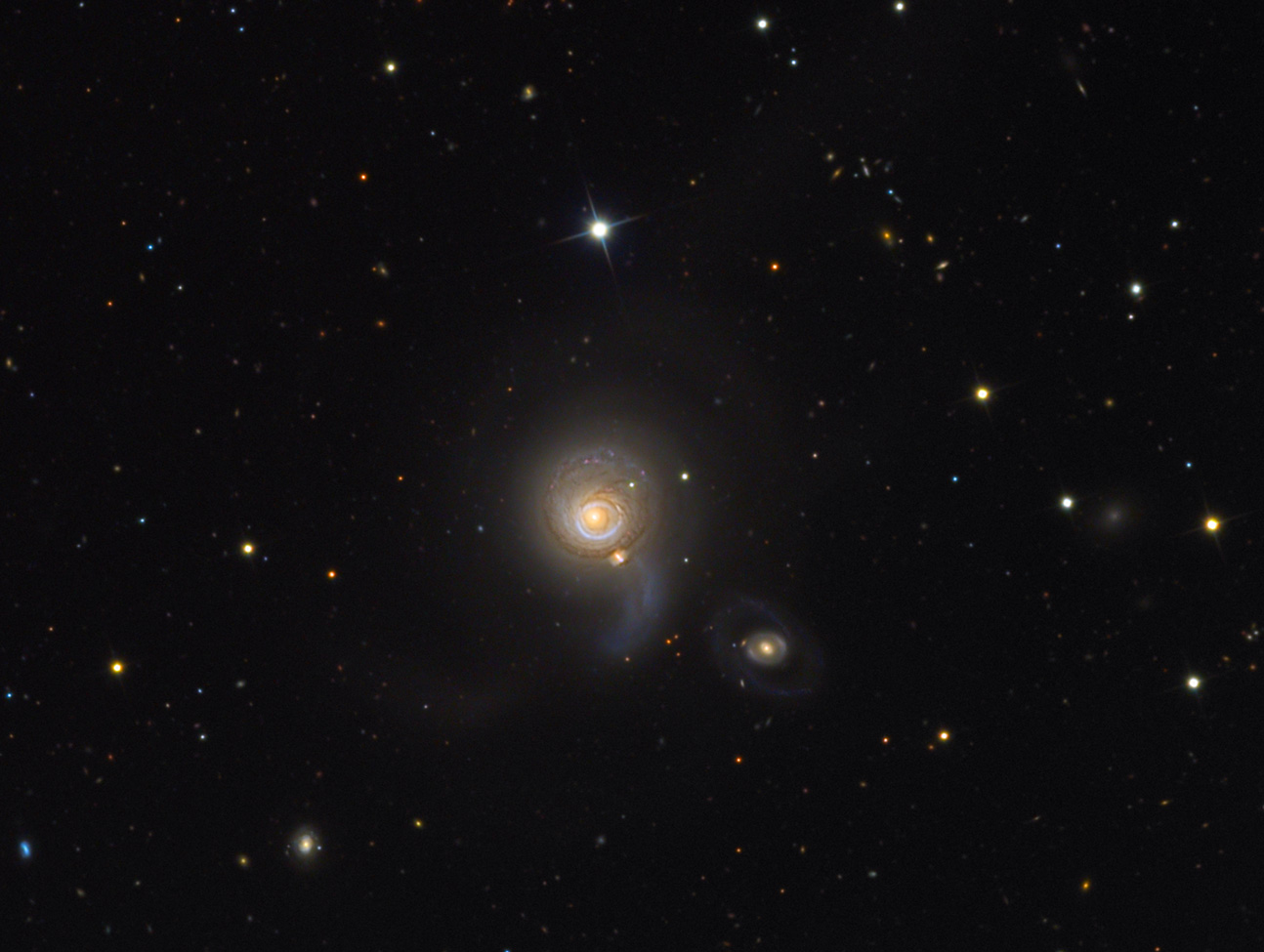
- NGC 5613, (bottom, right of center), NGC 5614, and NGC 5615 as imaged at the Mount Lemmon SkyCenter

Observation data (J2000 epoch)
- Constellation: Boötes
- Right ascension: 14^{h} 24^{m} 05.962^{s}
- Declination: +34° 53′ 31.02″
- Redshift: 0.029174 ± 0.000180
- Distance: 383 ± 27 Mly (117.5 ± 8.3 Mpc)
- Apparent magnitude (V): 15.5

Characteristics
- Type: (R)SAB0+(r)
- Apparent size (V): 0.470′ × 0.404′
- Notable features: Paired with NGC 5614.

Other designations
- 2MASX J14240596+3453310, LEDA 51433, MCG+06-32-021, NPM1G +35.0310, PGC 51433, UGC 9228, VV 77c

NGC 5613 is a lenticular galaxy (type S0a) in the constellation Boötes. It is part of the Arp 178 set of interacting galaxies, with NGC 5615 and NGC 5614.
