= NGC 232 =

Spiral galaxy in the constellation Cetus

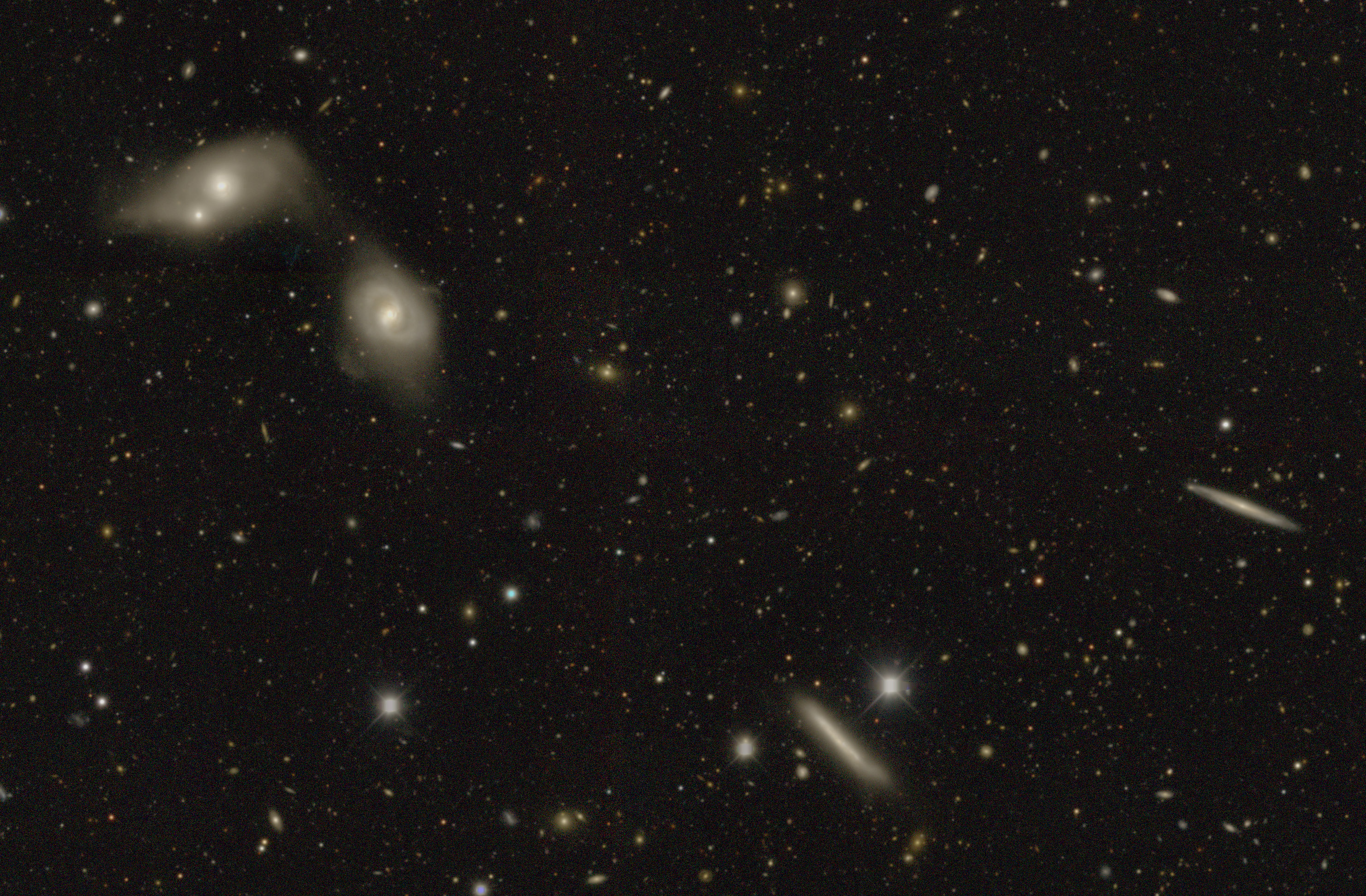
- DECam image. NGC 232 and NGC 235 are the interacting pair on the upper left. NGC 232 is the spiral galaxy slightly to the lower right. NGC 230 is at the bottom and IC 1573 is on the right.

Observation data (J2000 epoch)
- Constellation: Cetus
- Right ascension: 00^{h} 42^{m} 45.814^{s}
- Declination: −23° 33′ 40.69″
- Redshift: 0.022890
- Distance: 275.0 Mly (84.33 Mpc)
- Apparent magnitude (V): 14.46

Characteristics
- Type: SB(r) or Sa
- Apparent size (V): 1.0' × 0.8'

Other designations
- ESO 474- G 015, 6dF J0042457-233341, PMN J0042-2333, IRAS 00402-2350, 2MASX J00424581-2333406, NGC 232, MCG -04-02-040

NGC 232 is a spiral galaxy located in the equatorial constellation of Cetus, the whale. It was discovered in 1886 by the American astronomer Francis Leavenworth. NGC 232 has an apparent visual magnitude of 14.5 and an angular size of 1.0′ × 0.8′. It is located at an estimated distance of 275 million light-years (84.33 Mpc), and is part of a group that includes NGC 235.

This is a Type II Seyfert galaxy; a class of galaxy with an active galactic nucleus. There is a circumnuclear star forming ring with a radius of about 1,400 ly (440 pc). NGC 232 is classified as a luminous infrared galaxy and is radio quiet. In 2017, a linear emission line feature was reported in this galaxy. This jet-like structure extended from the nucleus for a distance of approximately 9.8 kly (3 kpc), with a width of 2.6 kly (0.8 kpc). It is not perpendicular to the galaxy disk. As of the date of discovery, it is the second longest such feature detected in a galaxy, exceeded only by 3C 120.

On September 3, 2006, K. Itagaki of Yamagata, Japan, reported the discovery of a magnitude 16.1 supernova in NGC 232. Designated SN 2006et, it was located at a position of 0.3″ east and 11.0″ north of the galaxy's center. The spectrum was similar to Type Ia supernova event, with a slow decline pattern such as SN 1997br or SN 1995ac.
