= NGC 5545 =

Spiral galaxy in the constellation Boötes

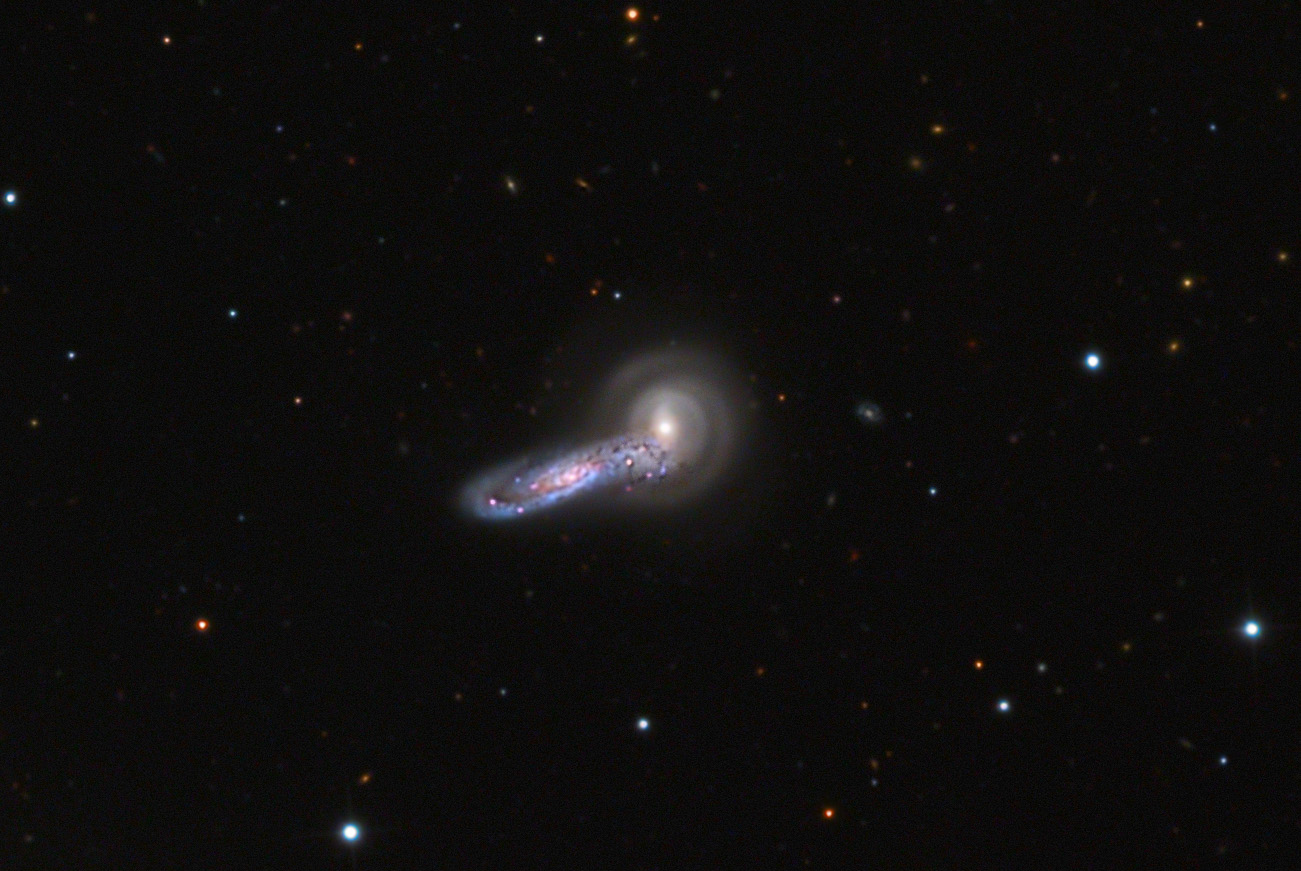
- NGC 5545 (left) and NGC 5544 imaged with a 32-inch telescope

Observation data (J2000 epoch)
- Constellation: Boötes
- Right ascension: 14^{h} 17^{m} 05.222^{s}
- Declination: +36° 34′ 30.87″
- Redshift: 0.010270±0.000033 (+3070 km/s)
- Distance: 158.4 Mly (48.56 Mpc)
- Apparent magnitude (V): 18.5

Characteristics
- Type: SA(s)bc:
- Apparent size (V): 0.08′ × 0.08′
- Notable features: Paired with NGC 5544

Other designations
- 2MASX J14170522+3634308, ARP 199, GC 3834, IRAS 14149+3648, KPG 422b, KUG 1414+368, LEDA 51023, MCG+06-31-091, PGC 51023, PRC D-46, UGC 9143, UZC J141705.3+363432, VV 210a, VV 210.

NGC 5545 is a spiral galaxy in the northern constellation of Boötes. It is interacting with the barred spiral galaxy NGC 5544.
