= NGC 4496 =

Galaxy in the constellation Virgo

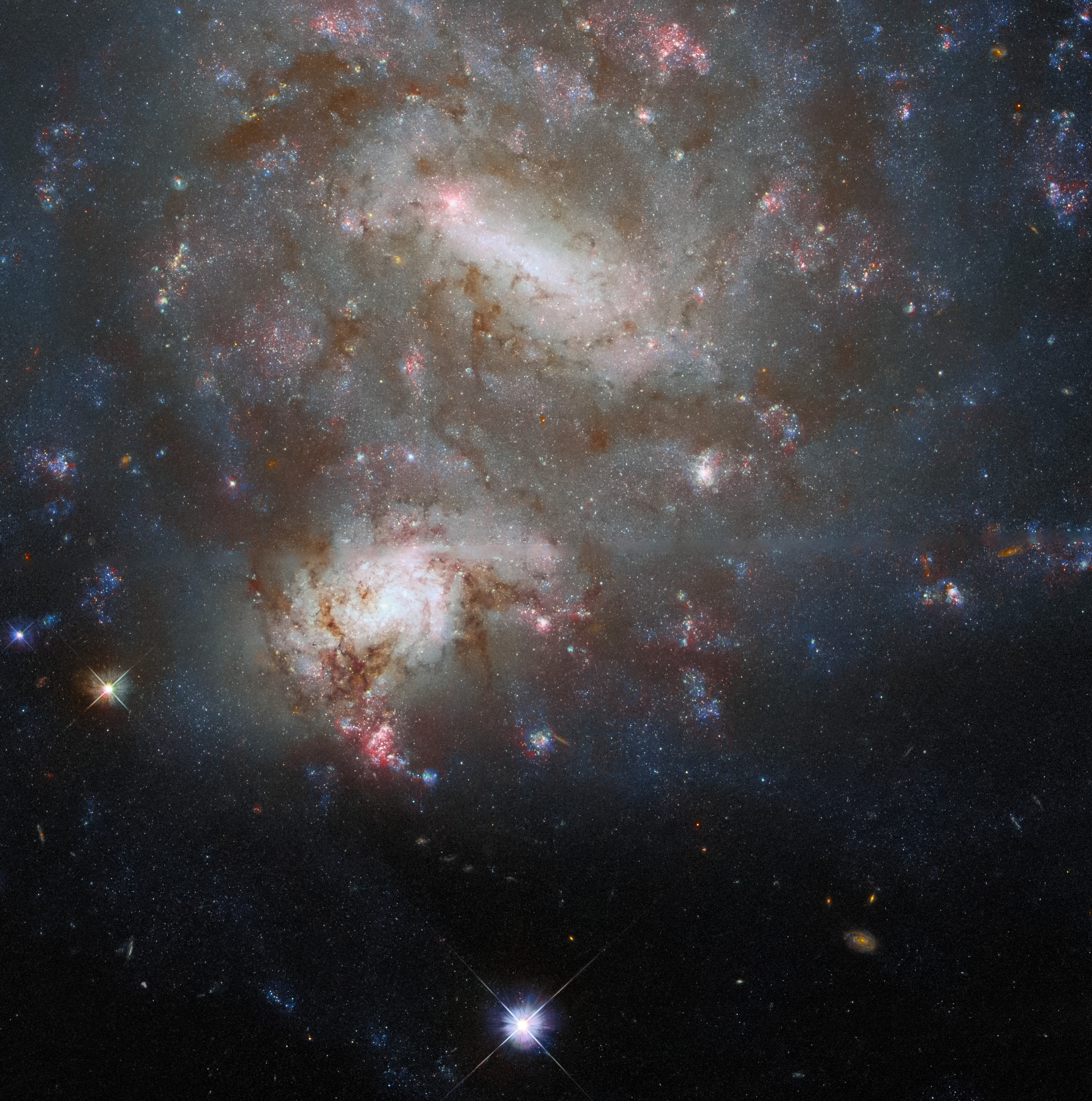
- NGC 4496 imaged by the Hubble Space Telescope

Observation data (J2000 epoch)
- Constellation: Virgo
- Right ascension: 12^{h} 31^{m} 39.2^{s}
- Declination: +03° 56′ 22″
- Redshift: 0.005774
- Heliocentric radial velocity: 1,731±16 km/s
- Distance: 99.7 ± 8.8 Mly (30.58 ± 2.69 Mpc)
- Group or cluster: Holm 415, VV 76, Virgo Cluster
- Apparent magnitude (V): 11.4

Characteristics
- Type: SBc
- Size: ~49,700 ly (15.24 kpc) (estimated)
- Apparent size (V): 1.1′ × 0.6′

Other designations
- HOLM 415, NGC 4505, UGC 7668, MCG +01-32-090, PGC 41471 and 41473, CGCG 042-144, VV 76

NGC 4496 is a pair of galaxies in the constellation of Virgo. Individually, the larger, northern galaxy is designated NGC 4496A, and the smaller, southern galaxy as NGC 4496B. They were discovered by German-British astronomer William Herschel on 23 February 1784. Herschel described his observation as a double-nucleus galaxy or as two nebulae. Herschel observed them again on 11 March 1784, not realizing he had already seen them. This resulted in two New General Catalogue entries for this galaxy group: NGC 4496 and NGC 4505.

The velocity with respect to the cosmic microwave background for NGC 4496A is 2,072±24 km/s, which corresponds to a Hubble distance of 99.7 ± 7.1 Mly (30.57 ± 2.17 Mpc). However, 47 non-redshift measurements give a much closer distance of 49.50 ± 1.01 Mly (15.177 ± 0.309 Mpc).

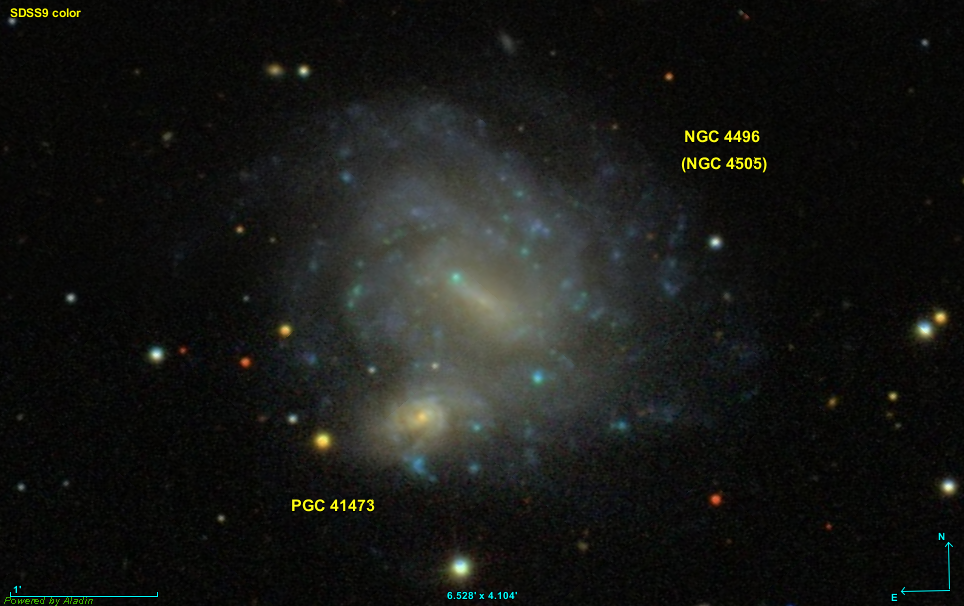
NGC 4496A and NGC 4496B imaged by SDSS

The velocity with respect to the cosmic microwave background for NGC 4496B is 4,872±24 km/s, which corresponds to a Hubble distance of 234.4 ± 16.4 Mly (71.86 ± 5.04 Mpc).

NGC 4496A along with NGC 4496B are listed together as Holm 415 in Erik Holmberg's A Study of Double and Multiple Galaxies Together with Inquiries into some General Metagalactic Problems, published in 1937. They are also listed as VV 76 in the Vorontsov-Vel'yaminov Interacting Galaxies catalogue. This grouping is purely optical, as NGC 4496B is much more distant than NGC 4496A.

== Morphology ==
Eskridge, Frogel, and Pogge published a paper in 2002 describing the morphology of 205 closely spaced spiral or lenticular galaxies. The observations were made in the H-band of the infrared and in the B-band (blue). Eskridge and colleagues described NGC 4136 as follows:

Faint nucleus within a thin, very prominent bar. There is a hint of spiral structure to the NW (away from the brighter galaxy [NGC 4496B]), but otherwise the disk is very patchy and irregular. There appear to be many luminous knots/companion galaxies. Most of these are associated with the NW system, but they exist throughout the region.

== Supernovae ==
Three supernovae have been observed in NGC 4496:

- SN 1960F (Type Ia, mag. 11.6) was discovered by Milton Hummason on 17 April 1960.
- SN 1988M (Type II) was discovered by Alex Filippenko and Wallace L. W. Sargent on 7 April 1988.
- SN 2025nqb (Type Ib, mag. 18.868) was discovered by Supernovae and Gravitational Lenses Follow up (SGLF) on 16 June 2025. It was initially classified as Type Ic, but later analysis concluded it to be Type Ib.

== See also ==
- List of NGC objects (4001–5000)
