= NGC 5544 =

Galaxy in the constellation Boötes

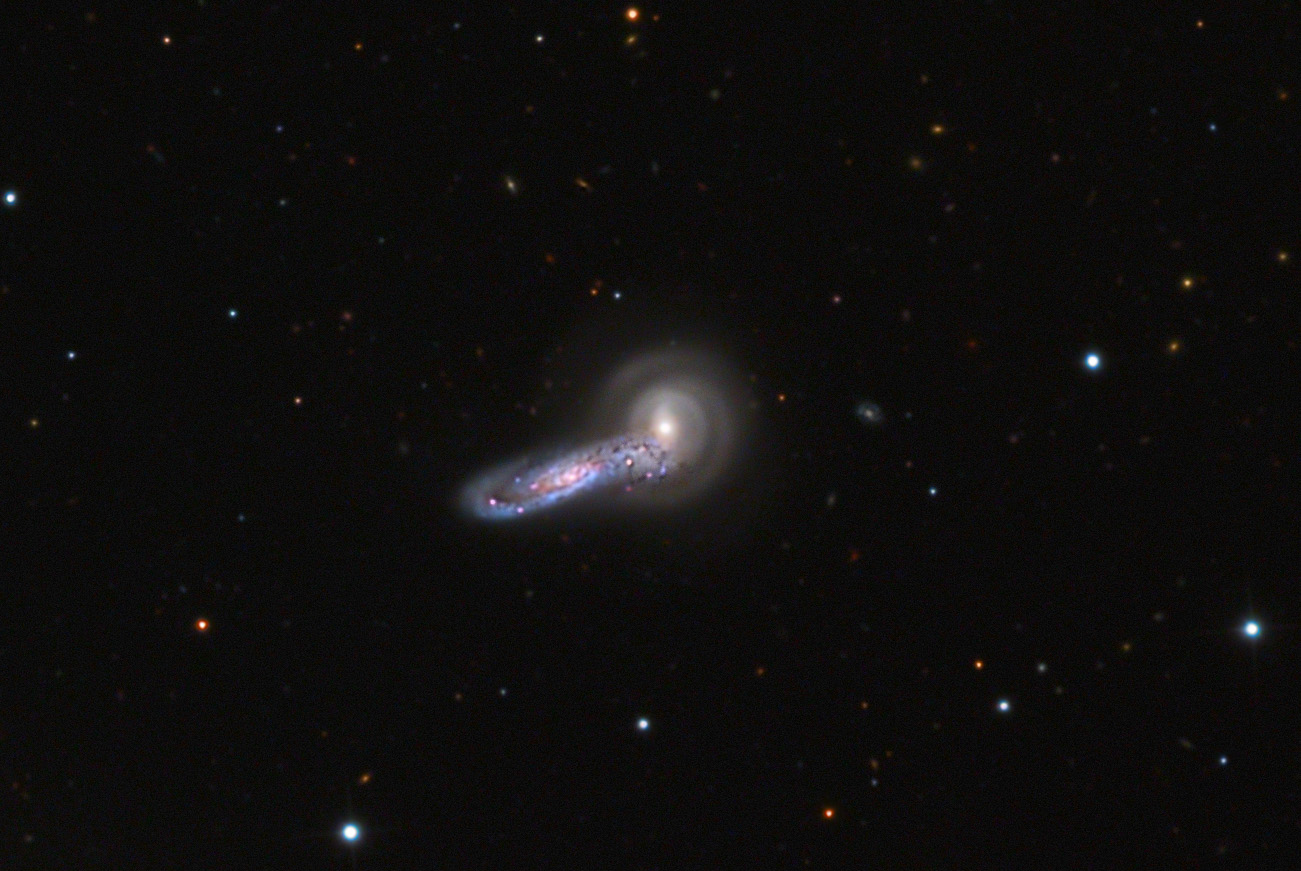
- NGC 5544 (right) and NGC 5545 (left) imaged with a 32-inch telescope

Observation data (J2000 epoch)
- Constellation: Boötes
- Right ascension: 14^{h} 17^{m} 02.63^{s}
- Declination: +36° 34′ 15.9″
- Redshift: 0.010140 ± 0.000057 (3,040 km/s)
- Distance: 139.6 ± 9.8 Mly (42.8 ± 3.0 Mpc)
- Apparent magnitude (V): 14.0

Characteristics
- Type: (R)SB(rs)0/a
- Apparent size (V): 1.08′ × 1.05′
- Notable features: Paired with NGC 5545

Other designations
- APG 199, ARP 199, CGCG 191.073, GC 3833, H II-419, h 1771, KCPG 422A, KPG 422a, LEDA 51018, MCG+06-31-090, PGC 51018, PRC D-46, UGC 9142, UZC J141702.5+363417, VV210, Z 191-73, Z 1415.0+3648.

NGC 5544 is a barred spiral galaxy in the constellation Boötes. It is interacting with spiral galaxy NGC 5545.
