= NGC 5579 =

Spiral galaxy in the constellation Boötes

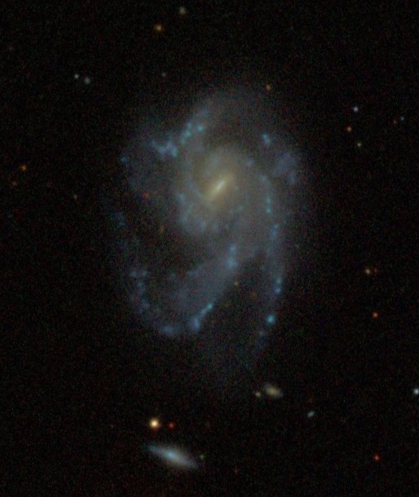
- SDSS image of NGC 5579

Observation data (J2000 epoch)
- Constellation: Boötes
- Right ascension: 14^{h} 20^{m} 26.484^{s}
- Declination: +35° 11′ 19.66″
- Redshift: 0.01199±0.00001
- Heliocentric radial velocity: 3,608 km/s
- Distance: 179 ± 14 Mly (54.9 ± 4.3 Mpc)
- Apparent magnitude (B): 14.7

Characteristics
- Type: SABcd
- Apparent size (V): 1.22′ × 0.93′
- Notable features: Singular, disturbed

Other designations
- GC 3852, IRAS 14183+3524, 2MASX J14202656+3511188, NGC 5579, Arp 69, UGC 9180, LEDA 51236, MCG +06-32-002, PGC 51236, CGCG 191.080, 192.003, VV 142a

NGC 5579 is an intermediate spiral galaxy in the northern constellation of Boötes. It was discovered on May 1, 1785) by German-British astronomer William Herschel. The galaxy is located at a distance of 179 ± 14 million light-years (54.9 ± 4.3 Mpc) from the Milky Way, and is receding with a heliocentric radial velocity of 3,608 km/s. It is entry 69 in Halton Arp's Atlas of Peculiar Galaxies.

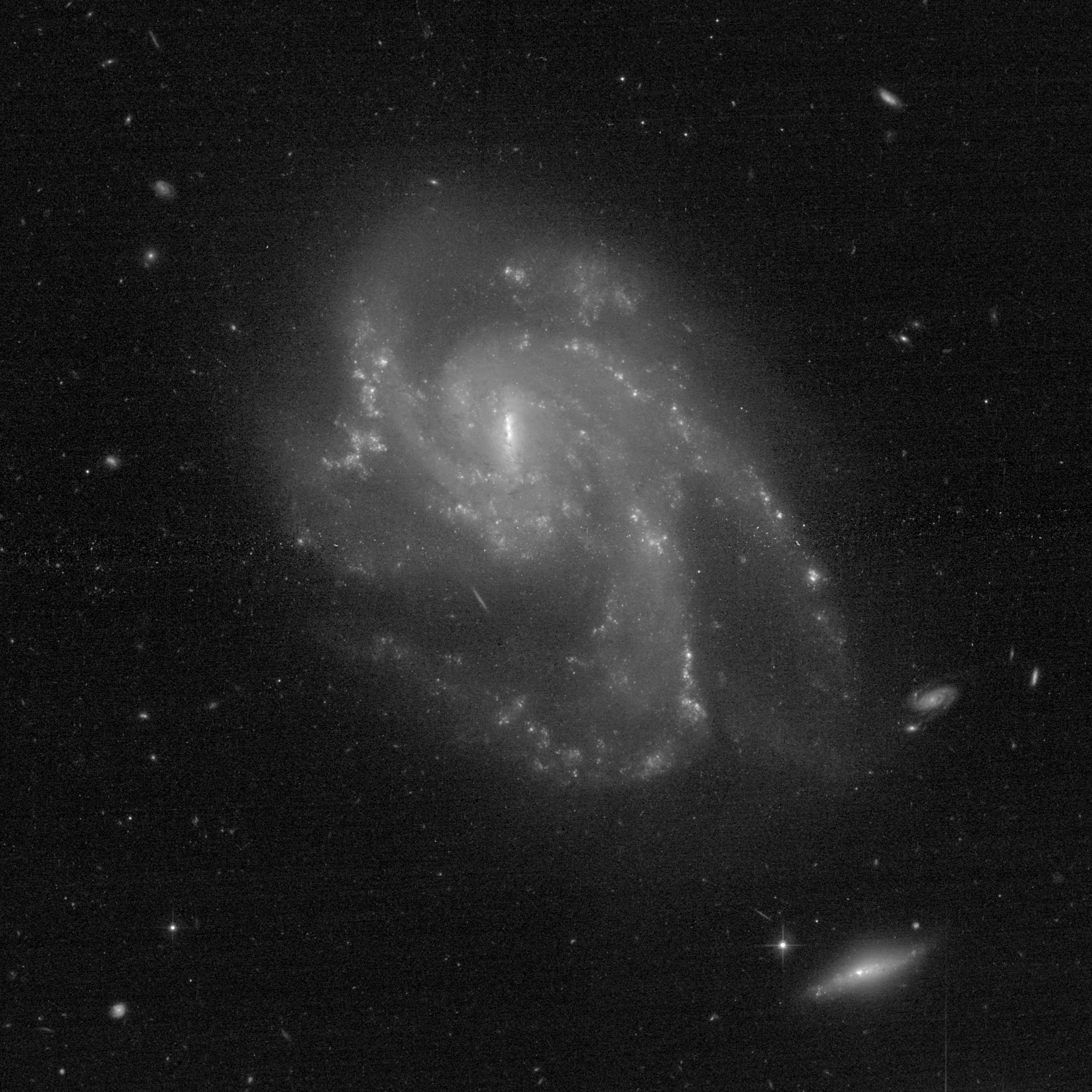
NGC 5579 with Hubble

On Dec. 17, 2006, a supernova designated SN 2006ss was discovered 22.7″ north and 11.9″ east of the galactic center. It was determined to be a type IIb supernova based on the spectrum.
