= NGC 5614 =

Galaxy in the constellation Boötes

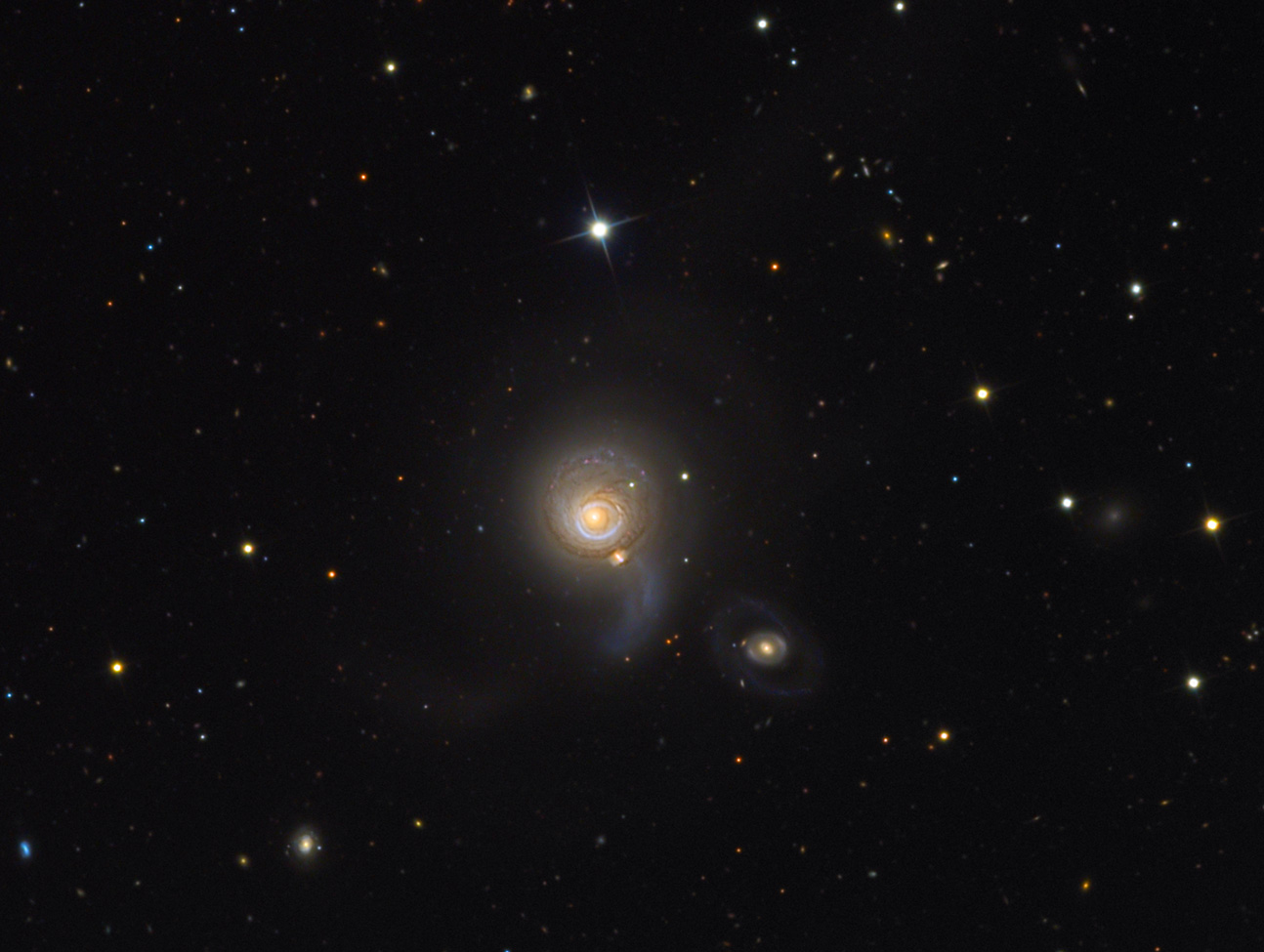
- NGC 5614, (largest galaxy), NGC 5613, and NGC 5615 as imaged at the Mount Lemmon SkyCenter

Observation data (J2000 epoch)
- Constellation: Boötes
- Right ascension: 14^{h} 24^{m} 07.591^{s}
- Declination: +34° 51′ 32.02″
- Redshift: 0.012970 (3,891 km/s )
- Distance: 194.9 Mly (59.76 Mpc)
- Apparent magnitude (V): 12.6

Characteristics
- Type: SA(r)ab pec
- Apparent size (V): 1.567′ × 1.410′
- Notable features: NGC 5615 superimposed, plume, paired with NGC 5613.

Other designations
- 2MASX J14240759+3451320, CGCG 192.014, GC 3880, h 1804, H 2.420, H II-420, IRAS 14220+3505, ISOSS J14240+3451, MCG+06-32-022, PGC 51439, UGC 9226, UZC J142407.6+345134, VV 77a, LEDA 51439, Z 192-14, Z 1422.0+3505

NGC 5614 is an unbarred spiral galaxy in the constellation Boötes. It is the primary member of the Arp 178 triplet of interacting galaxies with NGC 5613 and NGC 5615.
