= NGC 5230 =

Galaxy in the constellation Virgo

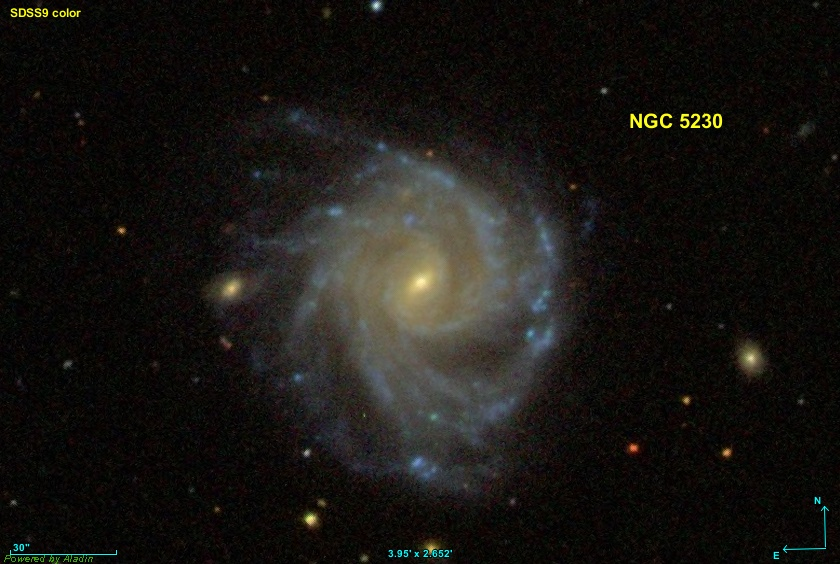
- NGC 5230 imaged by SDSS

Observation data (J2000 epoch)
- Constellation: Virgo
- Right ascension: 13^{h} 35^{m} 31.8833^{s}
- Declination: +13° 40′ 34.263″
- Redshift: 0.022919±0.0000134
- Heliocentric radial velocity: 6,871±4 km/s
- Distance: 80.34 ± 8.75 Mly (24.633 ± 2.683 Mpc)
- Group or cluster: NGC 5230 group
- Apparent magnitude (V): 12.77

Characteristics
- Type: SA(s)c
- Size: ~51,400 ly (15.76 kpc) (estimated)
- Apparent size (V): 2.2′ × 1.9′

Other designations
- IRAS 13330+1355, 2MASX J13353188+1340344, UGC 8573, MCG +02-35-009, PGC 47932, CGCG 073-043

NGC 5230 is a spiral galaxy in the constellation of Virgo. Its velocity with respect to the cosmic microwave background is 7,150±20 km/s, which corresponds to a Hubble distance of 344.0 ± 24.1 Mly (105.46 ± 7.39 Mpc). However, six non-redshift measurements give a much closer mean distance of 80.34 ± 8.75 Mly (24.633 ± 2.683 Mpc). It was discovered by German-British astronomer William Herschel on 12 April 1784.

== NGC 5230 group ==
According to Abraham Mahtessian, NGC 5230 is a member of a galaxy group named after it. The other galaxies in the group are NGC 5221 and NGC 5222.

== Supernovae ==
Two supernovae have been observed in NGC 5230:

- SN 1970P (type unknown, mag. 17.2) was discovered by Mnatskanian on 4 June 1970.
- SN 2026fjy (Type II-P, mag. 19.737) was discovered by ATLAS on 10 March 2026.

== See also ==
- List of NGC objects (5001–6000)
