= NGC 5221 =

Galaxy in the constellation Virgo

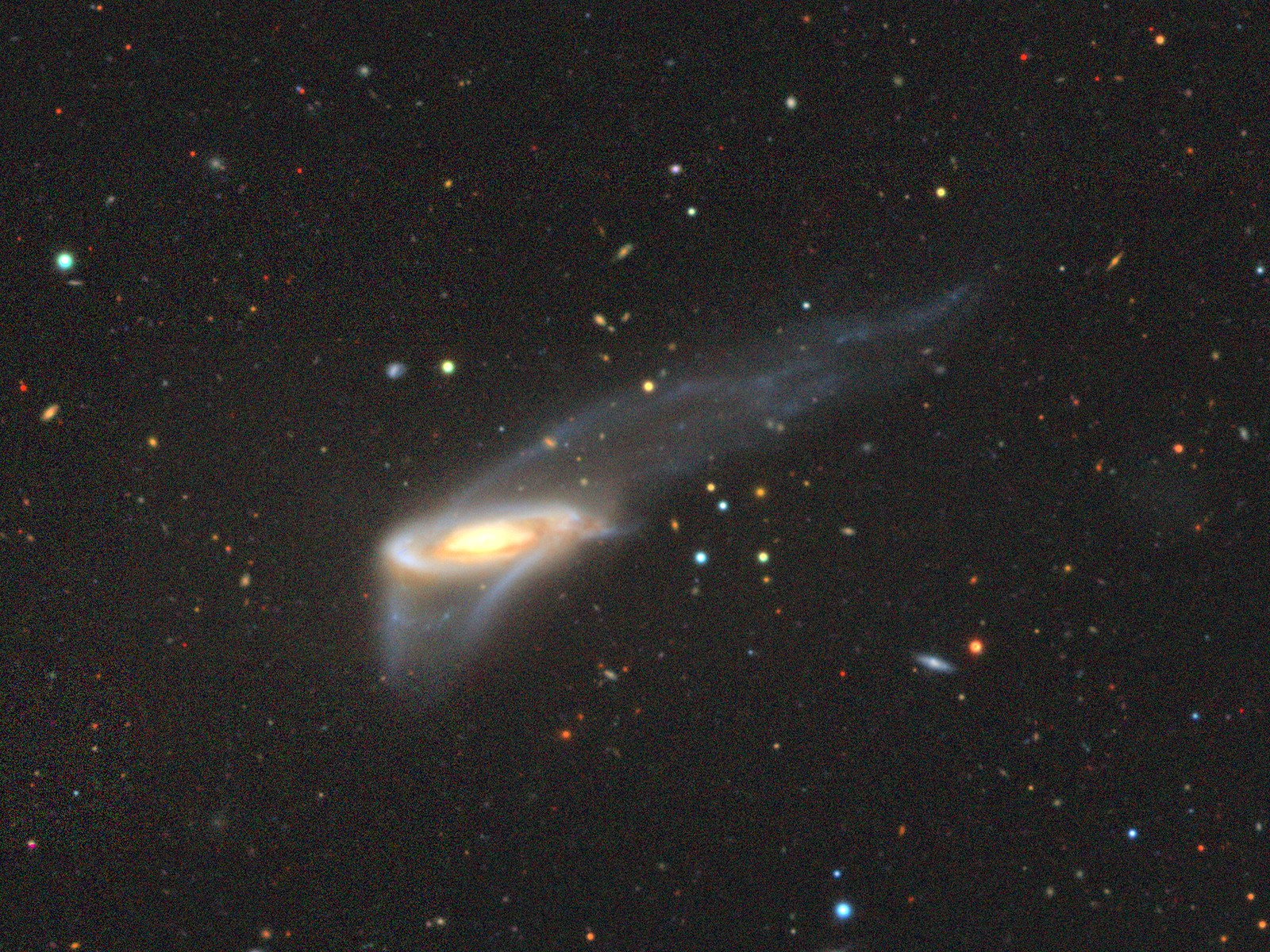
- NGC 5221 imaged by Legacy Surveys

Observation data (J2000 epoch)
- Constellation: Virgo
- Right ascension: 13^{h} 34^{m} 55.9030^{s}
- Declination: +13° 49′ 57.055″
- Redshift: 0.023279±0.0000270
- Heliocentric radial velocity: 6,979±8 km/s
- Distance: 317.31 ± 5.34 Mly (97.288 ± 1.638 Mpc)
- Apparent magnitude (V): 13.80

Characteristics
- Type: Sb
- Size: ~276,900 ly (84.90 kpc) (estimated)
- Apparent size (V): 2.4′ × 0.8′

Other designations
- IRAS F13324+1405, 2MASX J13345590+1349571, Arp 288 NED03, UGC 8559, MCG +02-35-006, PGC 47869, CGCG 073-040, VV 315b

NGC 5221 is a spiral galaxy in the constellation of Virgo. Its velocity with respect to the cosmic microwave background is 7,258±21 km/s, which corresponds to a Hubble distance of 349.2 ± 24.5 Mly (107.06 ± 7.50 Mpc). However, eight non-redshift measurements give a closer mean distance of 317.31 ± 5.34 Mly (97.288 ± 1.638 Mpc). It was discovered by German-British astronomer William Herschel on 12 April 1784.

NGC 5221 is a radio galaxy, i.e. it has giant regions of radio emission extending well beyond its visible structure.

== Arp 288 ==
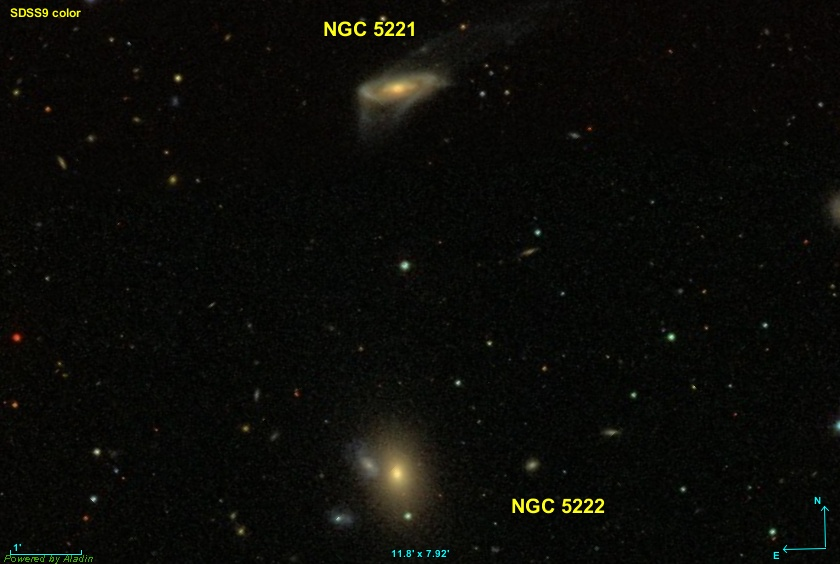
The 3 galaxies of Arp 288 [PGC 93122, not labelled, is just to the left of NGC 5222]

NGC 5221 together with NGC 5222 and PGC 93122 are catalogued as Arp 288 by Halton Arp in his Atlas of Peculiar Galaxies, in the category of "wind effects." The group is described by Arp as "Streamers in both directions from edge of spiral." The three galaxies are also listed as VV 315 in the Vorontsov-Vel'yaminov Interacting Galaxies catalogue.

== Supernova ==
One supernova has been observed in NGC 5221:

- SN 2016bln (Type Ia-91T, mag. 19.2) was discovered by the Palomar Transient Factory on 4 April 2016. At the time, it was described as "one of the earliest detections of an over-luminous SN Ia made to date."

== Image gallery ==
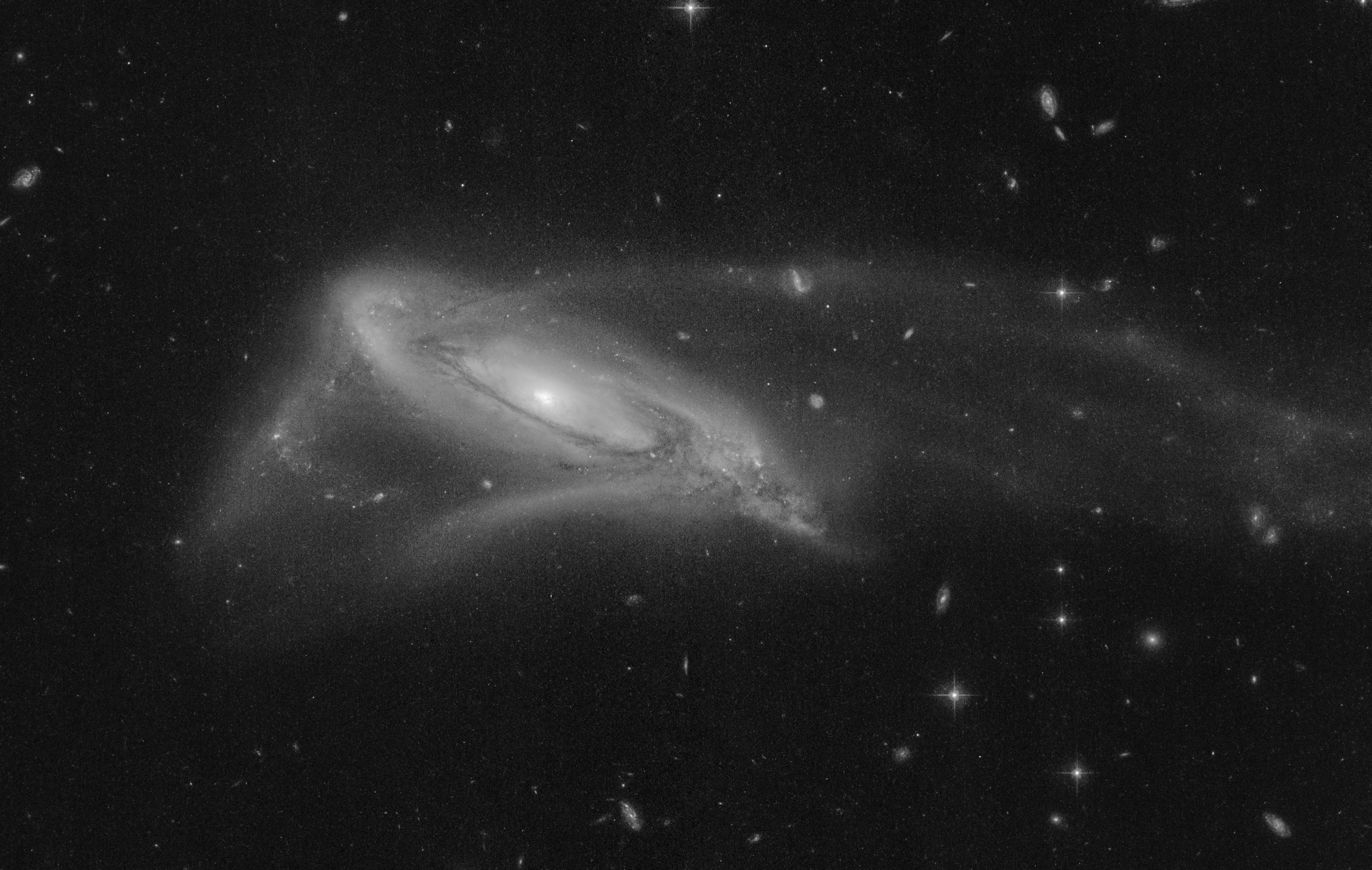
NGC 5221 imaged by the Hubble Space Telescope

== See also ==
- List of NGC objects (5001–6000)
- Atlas of Peculiar Galaxies
