= NGC 3187 =

Barred spiral galaxy in the constellation Leo

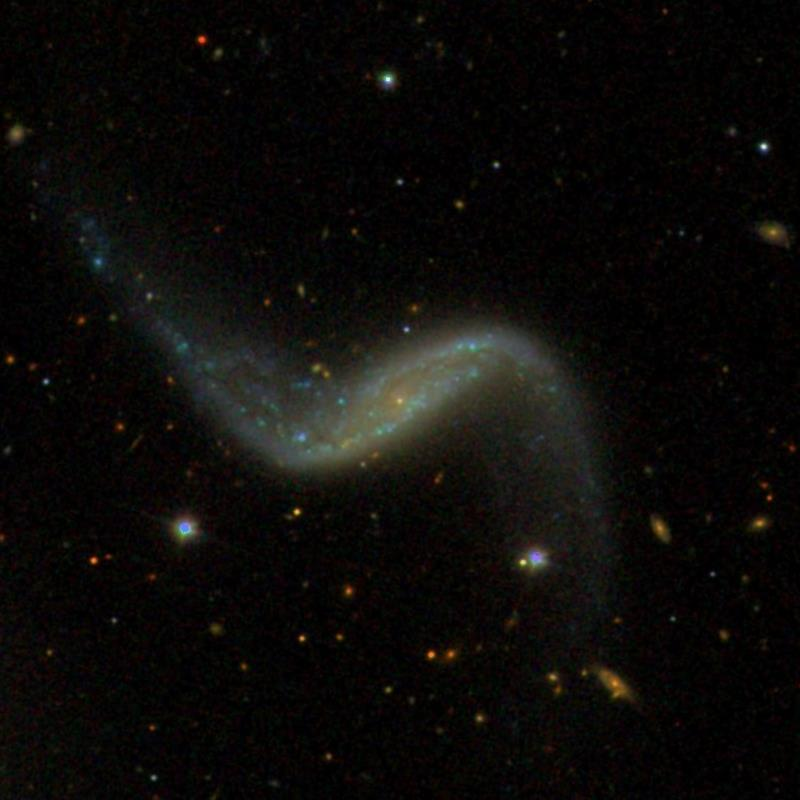
- NGC 3187, as seen during the Sloan Digital Sky Survey

Observation data (J2000 epoch)
- Constellation: Leo
- Right ascension: 10h 17m 48s
- Declination: +21° 52′ 23″
- Redshift: 0.005290
- Heliocentric radial velocity: 1,586 km/s
- Distance: 91 Mly (28.04 Mpc)
- Apparent magnitude (V): 13.44
- Apparent magnitude (B): 13.91
- Surface brightness: 23.35 mag/arcsec^2

Characteristics
- Type: SBsc
- Size: 85,000 ly (estimated)
- Apparent size (V): 3.0' x 1.3'

Other designations
- PGC 30068, HCG 44D, VV307b, UGC 5556, CGCG 123-036, MCG +04-24-025, ARP 316

NGC 3187, also known as HGC 44D, is a large barred spiral galaxy located in the constellation Leo. Its velocity relative to the cosmic microwave background is 1,901 ± 22 km/s, which corresponds to a Hubble distance of 28.0 ± 2.0 Mpc (~91.3 million ly). NGC 3187 was discovered by Irish physicist George Stoney in 1850.

The luminosity class of NGC 3187 is III and it has a broad HI line. It also contains regions of ionized hydrogen.

With a surface brightness equal to 15.30 mag/am^2, NGC 3187 is classified as a low surface brightness galaxy (LSB). LSB galaxies are diffuse galaxies with a surface brightness less than one magnitude lower than that of the ambient night sky.

To date, eight non-redshift measurements yield a distance of 25,700 ± 10,409 Mpc (~83.8 million ly), which is within the Hubble distance range.

== Hickson 44 ==
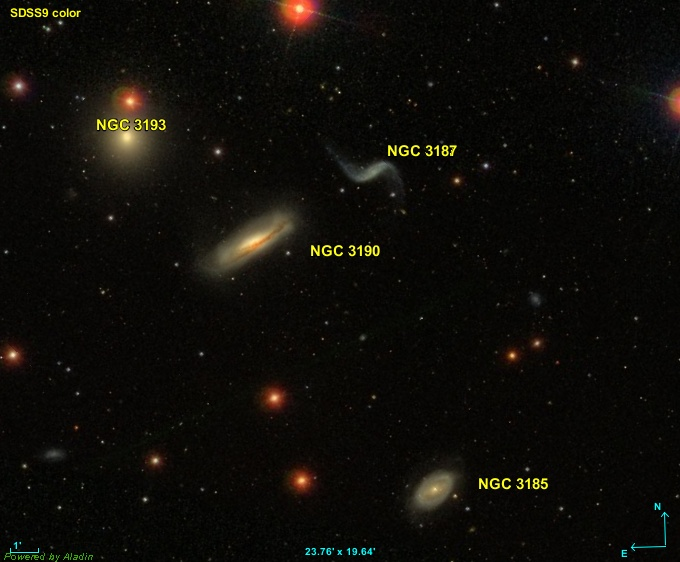
The four members of Hickson Compact Group 44.

NGC 3185 (HCG 44c), NGC 3187 (HCG 44d), NGC 3190 (HCG 44a) and NGC 3193 (HCG 44b) form the Hickson Compact Group HCG 44. The galaxies NGC 3187, NGC 3190 and NGC 3193 appear in the Atlas of Peculiar Galaxies under the designation Arp 316.

== See also ==
- Leo II Groups
- List of spiral galaxies
