= NGC 235 =

Galaxies in the constellation Cetus

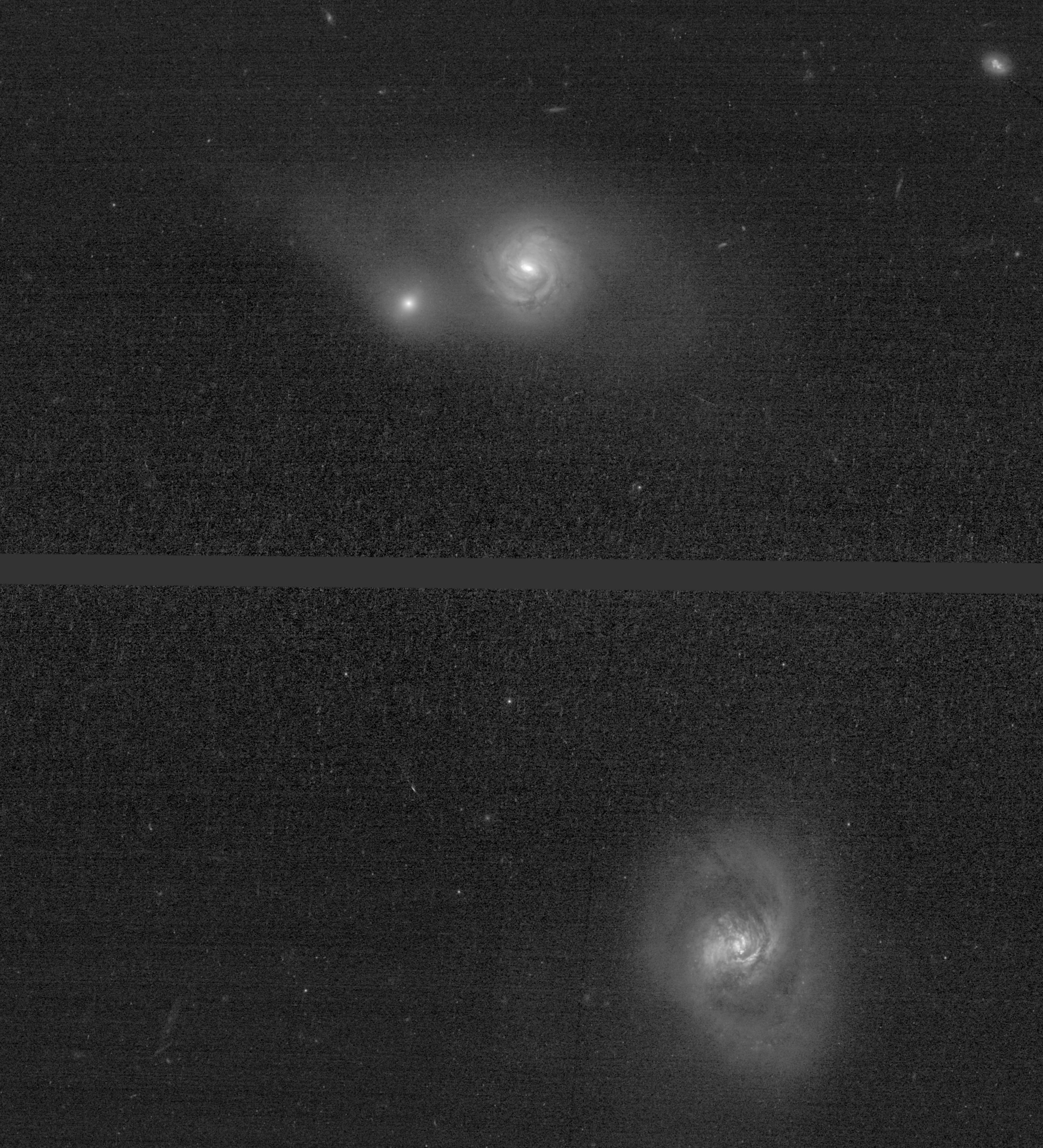
- Hubble Space Telescope image of NGC 235 (top) and NGC 232 (bottom)

Observation data (J2000 epoch)
- Constellation: Cetus
- Right ascension: 00^{h} 42^{m} 53.2^{s}
- Declination: −23° 32′ 36″
- Redshift: 0.022229
- Heliocentric radial velocity: 6664 km/h
- Galactocentric velocity: 6674 km/h
- Distance: 78.3 ± 5.5 Mpc (255.6 ± 20.9 Mly)
- Apparent magnitude (V): 14.5

Characteristics
- Type: S0/(r)a? pec
- Size: 120 kly across
- Apparent size (V): 1.3' x 0.7'

Other designations
- ESO 352-IG 066, ESO 012138-3519.7, PGC 5120

NGC 235 is a lenticular galaxy in the constellation of Cetus. Its companion, PGC 2570, appears in the line of sight of NGC 235, but has no relation with NGC 235. This pair was first discovered by Francis Leavenworth in 1886. Dreyer, the compiler of the catalogue, described the galaxy as "extremely faint, small, round, brighter middle and nucleus".
