= 3C 390.3 =

Galaxy in the constellation Draco

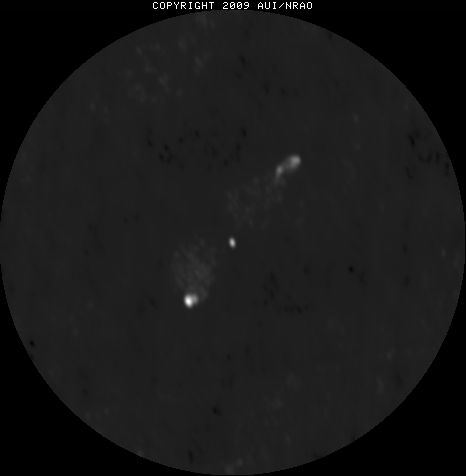

Observation data (J2000 epoch)
- Constellation: Draco
- Right ascension: 18^{h} 42^{m} 08.9899^{s}
- Declination: +79° 46′ 17.128″
- Redshift: 0.056159 ± 0.000464
- Apparent magnitude (V): 14.64

Characteristics
- Type: S0
- Apparent size (V): 0.4'X0.32'

Other designations
- LEDA 62274, 4C 79.18, PCG 62274

3C 390.3 is a broad-line radio galaxy located in the constellation Draco. It is also a Seyfert 1 galaxy which is an X-ray source.
