= Boris Vorontsov-Velyaminov =

Russian astrophysicist

Doctor Boris Aleksandrovich Vorontsov-Velyaminov
- Борис Александрович Воронцов-Вельяминов
- Born: 14 February [O.S. 1 February] 1904; Yekaterinoslav, Russian Empire (now Dnipro, Ukraine)
- Died: 27 January 1994 (aged 89); Moscow, Russia
- Occupations: Astrophysicist, Astronomer
- Known for: Vorontsov-Vel'yaminov Interacting Galaxies

Boris Aleksandrovich Vorontsov-Velyaminov (Russian: Борис Александрович Воронцов-Вельяминов; February 14, 1904 – January 27, 1994) was a Russian astrophysicist. His name is sometimes given as Vorontsov-Vel'yaminov.

== Biography ==
Vorontsov-Velyaminov was born in 1904 in Dnipro, now in Ukraine. While in primary school, he joined an astronomy club. In 1925 he graduated from the Physics and Mathematics Department of Moscow University. In 1935, he was awarded his doctorate degree.

== Career ==
He independently discovered the absorption of light by interstellar dust, which was also discovered by Robert Julius Trumpler. He compiled a catalogue of what are now known as Vorontsov-Velyaminov galaxies (the Atlas of Interacting Galaxies), as well as a larger and more general catalogue of galaxies (the Morphological Catalogue of Galaxies). He also studied and classified planetary nebulae. He is also the author of the standard Russian astronomy textbook for high schools as well as astronomy textbook for secondary school.

== Honors ==
He was awarded the Bredikhin Prize by the Russian Academy of Sciences.

The inner main belt asteroid (2916) Voronveliya is named after him.

== See also ==
- Vorontsov-Vel'yaminov Interacting Galaxies
