= NGC 3226 =

Dwarf elliptical galaxy in the constellation Leo

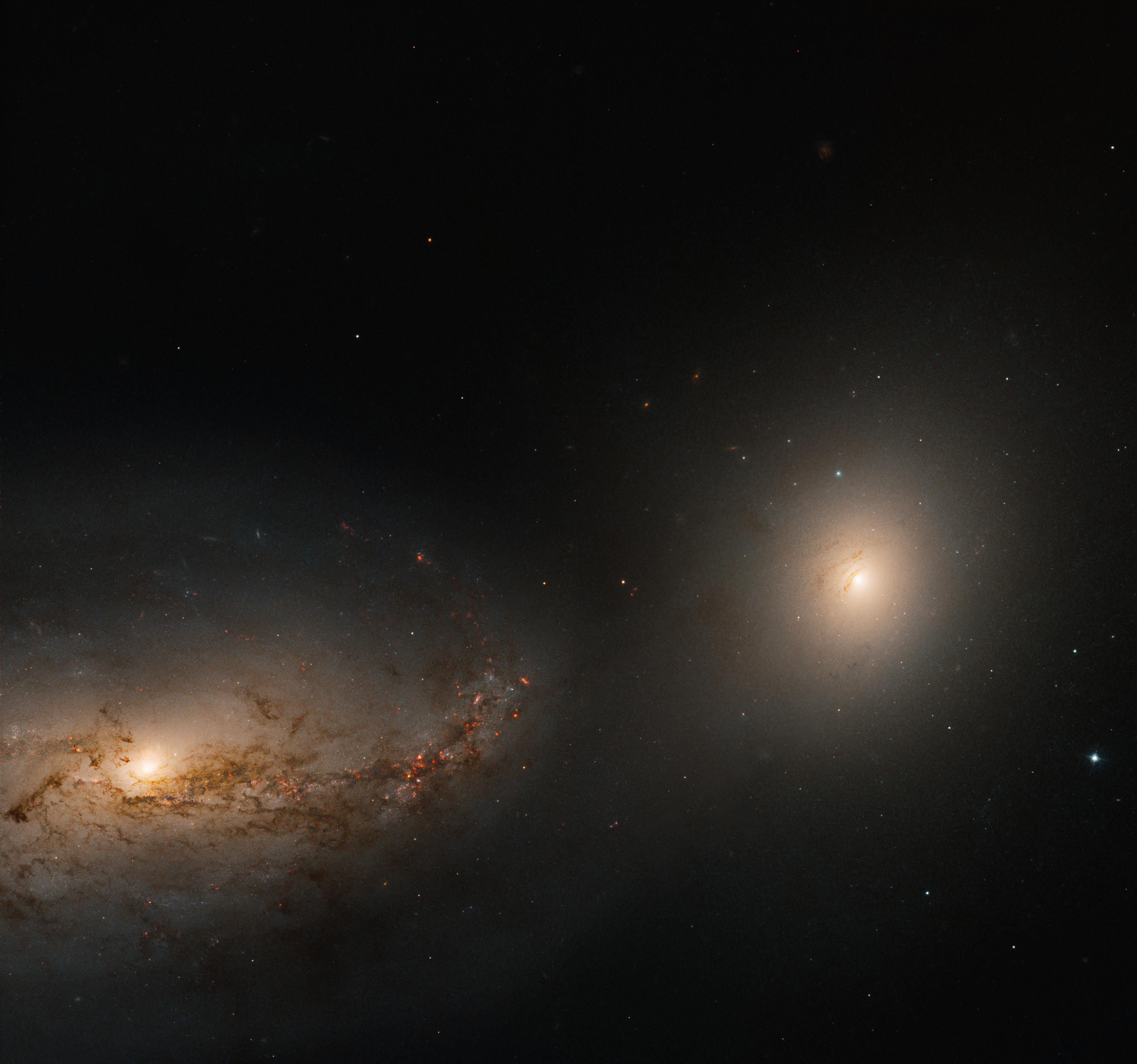
- NGC 3227 (left) and NGC 3226 (right)

Observation data (J2000 epoch)
- Constellation: Leo
- Right ascension: 10^{h} 23^{m} 27.0^{s}
- Declination: +19° 53′ 55″
- Redshift: 1151±10 km/s
- Distance: 76.81 ± 0.46 Mly (23.55 ± 0.14 Mpc)
- Apparent magnitude (V): 11.4

Characteristics
- Type: E2 pec
- Apparent size (V): 2.8′ × 2.0′

Other designations
- HOLM 187B, Arp 94, UGC 5617, MCG +03-27-015, PGC 30440, CGCG 094-026, VV 209b

NGC 3226 is a dwarf elliptical galaxy that is interacting with the spiral galaxy NGC 3227. They were both discovered by German-British astronomer William Herschel on 15 February 1784. The two galaxies are one of several examples of a spiral with a dwarf elliptical companion that are listed in the Atlas of Peculiar Galaxies. Both galaxies may be found in the constellation Leo. It is a member of the NGC 3227 Group of galaxies, which is a member of the Leo II Groups, a series of galaxies and galaxy clusters strung out from the right edge of the Virgo Supercluster.

== Nucleus ==
NGC 3226 contains a low-ionization nuclear emission-line region (LINER), a type of region that is characterized by spectral line emission from weakly ionized atoms. In general, the energy source for LINER emission has been a subject of debate among astronomers. Some astronomers have asserted that LINERs are powered by star formation regions, while other have asserted that LINERs are powered by active galactic nuclei (AGN) which contain supermassive black holes.

=== AGN ===
The nucleus of NGC 3226 appears to contain an AGN. The nucleus is a strong source of both radio and X-ray emission that appears to be synchrotron emission, which is generated when electrons moving at high speeds oscillate within magnetic fields. Such synchrotron emission is expected from the environment around a supermassive black hole. The X-ray emission may also be variable, which is also expected in the environment of a supermassive black hole.

== Interstellar medium ==
It is possible that NGC 3226 may be acquiring gas from NGC 3227 during the interaction process, which would enhance star formation within NGC 3226. However, millimeter observations of NGC 3226 failed to detect any molecular gas within the galaxy. These results not only demonstrate that NGC 3226 contains little molecular gas but also demonstrate that the galaxy has acquired no gas from NGC 3227.

== Supernova ==
One supernova has been observed in NGC 3226: SN 1976K (type unknown, mag. 17) was discovered by Arnold Klemola on 21 December 1976.

== See also ==
- List of NGC objects (3001–4000)
