= NGC 3227 =

Galaxy in the constellation Leo

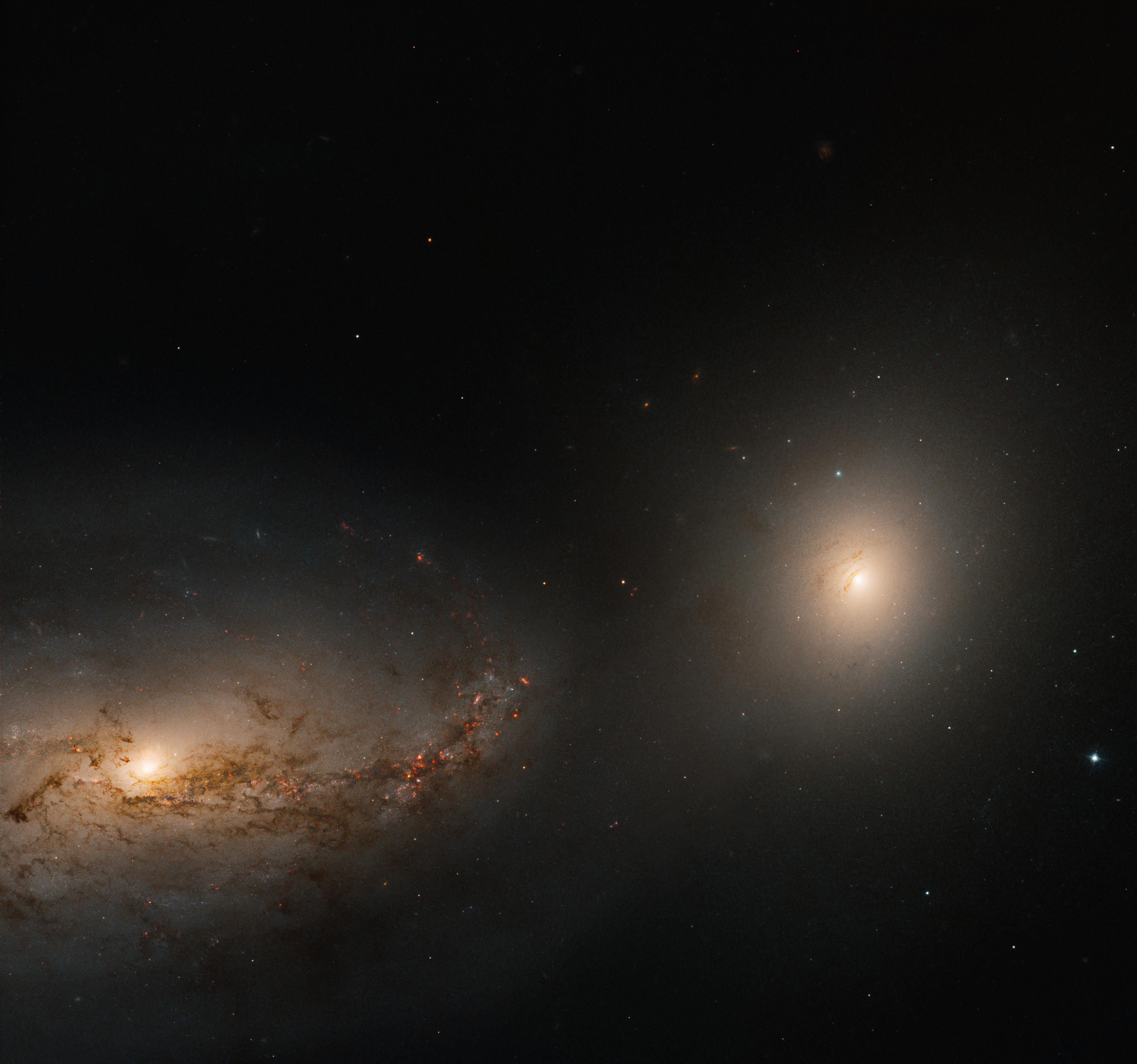
- Hubble Space Telescope image of NGC 3227 (left) and NGC 3226 (right)

Observation data (J2000 epoch)
- Constellation: Leo
- Right ascension: 10^{h} 23^{m} 30.6^{s}
- Declination: +19° 51′ 54″
- Redshift: 1,157±3 km/s
- Distance: 77 ± 9 Mly (24 ± 3 Mpc)
- Apparent magnitude (V): 10.3

Characteristics
- Type: SAB(s) pec
- Apparent size (V): 6.6′ × 5.0′

Other designations
- NGC 3227, Arp 94, UGC 5620, PGC 30445

NGC 3227 is an intermediate spiral galaxy that is interacting with the dwarf elliptical galaxy NGC 3226. The two galaxies are one of several examples of a spiral with a dwarf elliptical companion that are listed in the Atlas of Peculiar Galaxies. Both galaxies may be found in the constellation Leo. It is a member of the NGC 3227 Group of galaxies, which is a member of the Leo II Groups, a series of galaxies and galaxy clusters strung out from the right edge of the Virgo Supercluster.

Sir William Herschel already recognised them as a 'double nebula' and they were jointly listed as Holm 187 in the Catalogue of Double and Multiple Galaxies and as Arp 94 in the Atlas of Peculiar Galaxies. Amateur telescopes can discern them but require magnification of about 100 times. They are situated 50′ east of the well-known double star system Gamma Leonis (i.e. Algieba).

== Nucleus ==
NGC 3227 contains a Seyfert nucleus, a type of active galactic nucleus (AGN). Such Seyfert nuclei typically contain supermassive black holes. This object has an estimated mass of 1.4+1.0
−0.6×10^{7} M_{☉}.

As is typical of many AGN, the nucleus of NGC 3227 has been identified as a source of variable X-ray emission. This variability occurs on time scales ranging from a few hours to a few months. The variability may be caused by variations in the density or ionization of gas and dust near the AGN that absorb the X-ray emission. A substantial amount of the X-ray-absorbing gas may lie within 0.4 parsec (1.3 light-years) of the nucleus. An observed change in the shape of the X-ray spectrum in 2000 and 2001 suggests that some of the X-ray absorbing gas is located within 10–100 light-days of the nucleus.

The luminosity of the nucleus reached a maximum in 1977 when evidence suggesting long-lived one-sided or two-sided gas streams was obtained. X-ray radiation of the central accretion disc is reprocessed in one to two days to be re-emitted in the optical spectrum. Infra-red light emission from the hot dust torus lags optical light emission from the nucleus by about 20 days in NGC 3227. The temperature of the dust torus is estimated at 1500 K to 1800 K in NGC 3227 and similar galaxies.

This galaxy was studied by the Multicolor Active Galactic Nuclei Monitoring 2m telescope.

== Supernova ==
One supernova has been observed in NGC 3227: SN 1983U (Type Ia, mag. 12) was discovered by Vladimir Pronik on 4 November 1983.

== See also ==
- List of NGC objects (3001–4000)
