= NGC 3301 =

Lenticular galaxy in the constellation Leo

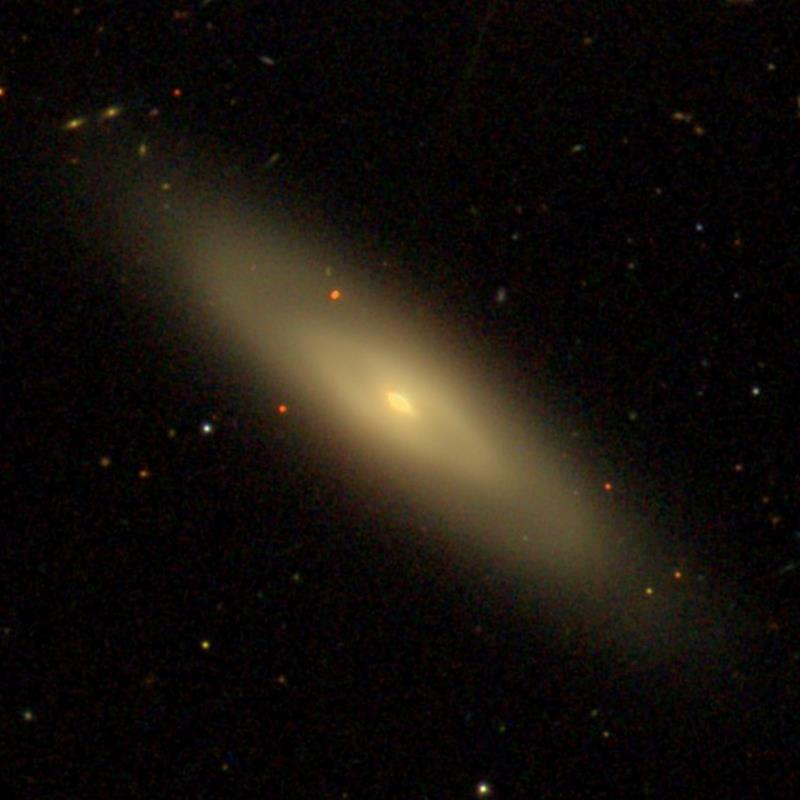
- SDSS image of NGC 3301

Observation data (J2000 epoch)
- Constellation: Leo
- Right ascension: 10^{h} 36^{m} 56.030^{s}
- Declination: +21° 52′ 55.80″
- Redshift: 0.004450
- Heliocentric radial velocity: 1331 km/s
- Distance: 74 Mly (22.8 Mpc)
- Apparent magnitude (V): 11.09
- Apparent magnitude (B): 12.2
- Absolute magnitude (V): −20.9

Characteristics
- Type: (R')SB(rs)0/a

Other designations
- UGC 5767, MCG +04-25-035, PGC 31497

NGC 3301, also known as NGC 3760, is a lenticular galaxy in the constellation Leo. Its apparent magnitude in the V-band is 11.1. It was first observed on March 12, 1784, by the astronomer William Herschel. It is a member of the Leo II Groups, a series of galaxies and galaxy clusters strung out from the right edge of the Virgo Supercluster.
