= Vorontsov-Vel'yaminov Interacting Galaxies =

Catalogue made by Vorontsov-Vel'yaminov

Vorontsov-Vel'yaminov Interacting Galaxies are interacting galaxies included in the Atlas and Catalogue of Interacting Galaxies, authored by Russian astronomers Boris Aleksandrovich Vorontsov-Vel'yaminov, Raisa Ivanovna Noskova and Vera Petrovna Arkhipova. It was published by the Astronomical Council of the Academy of Sciences of the USSR.

The atlas and catalogue contain 852 interacting systems. The first part published in 1959 contained 355 interacting galaxies numbered VV1 through VV355, and the second part published in 1977 included those numbered VV356 through VV852. In 2001, an additional 1162 objects were added from the Morphological Catalogue of Galaxies by Vorontsov-Vel'yaminov et al. These objects have numbers ranging from VV853 to VV2014.
