= Hickson Compact Group =

Catalogue of 100 galaxy groups made by Paul Hickson

- Alternative names: Hickson Galaxy Groups
- Related media on Commons

A Hickson Compact Group (abbreviation: HCG) is a collection of galaxies designated as published by Paul Hickson in 1982.

The most famous group on Hickson's list of 100 objects is HCG 92, Stephan's Quintet.

== Hickson Compact Groups ==
According to Hickson: “Most compact groups contain a high fraction of galaxies having morphological or kinematical peculiarities, nuclear radio and infrared emission, and starburst or active galactic nuclei (AGN) activity. They contain large quantities of diffuse gas and are dynamically dominated by dark matter. They most likely form as subsystems within looser associations and evolve by gravitational processes. Strong galaxy interactions result and merging is expected to lead to the ultimate demise of the group. Compact groups are surprisingly numerous, and may play a significant role in galaxy evolution.”

== List ==
Image	HCG	Right ascension	Declination	Galaxy count	Members	Notes
	1	00^{h} 26.0^{m}	+25° 43′	4	UGC 248, PGC 1625, PGC 1614, PGC 1618	In Andromeda, westnorthwest of HD 2315
	2	00^{h} 31^{m} 24^{s}	+08° 26.8′	4	UGC 312, Markarian 552, UGC 314, UGC 315	In Pisces, east of HD 2679
	3	00^{h} 34^{m} 11^{s}	−07° 35.6′	4	MCG-01-02-032, PGC 2064, PGC 2059, PGC 2043	In Cetus, less than 1 degree north of NGC 157
	4	00^{h} 34^{m} 15.3^{s}	−21° 26′ 52″	5	ESO 540-1, ESO 540-2, PGC 2051, PGC 2057, PGC 2040	In Cetus
	5	00^{h} 38^{m} 54^{s}	+07° 03.8′	4	NGC 190, NGC 190S, MCG+01-02-042, PGC 2326	In Pisces
	6	00^{h} 39^{m} 10^{s}	−08° 23.7′	4	PGC 2347, PGC 2350, PGC 2351, PGC 2353	In Cetus, south of the asterism Pointer made of HD 3841, HD 3821, HD 3770, HD 3733, and HD 3707
	7	00^{h} 39^{m} 15.9^{s}	+00° 53′ 17″	4	NGC 192, NGC 196, NGC 197, NGC 201	In Cetus, contains three spirals and one lenticular galaxy
	8	00^{h} 49^{m} 37^{s}	+23° 34.8′	4	MCG+04-03-008, PGC 2888, PGC 2890, PGC 2892	In Andromeda
	9	00^{h} 54^{m} 18^{s}	−23° 33.1′	4	MCG-04-03-027, MCG-04-03-028, PGC 3196, PGC 3200	In Cetus
	10	01^{h} 26^{m} 24.5^{s}	+34° 42′ 51″	4	NGC 536, NGC 529, NGC 531, NGC 542	In Andromeda
	11	01^{h} 26.6^{m}	−23° 13′	4	ESO 476-8, MCG-04-04-010, PGC 5357, PGC 5381	In Cetus
	12	01^{h} 27^{m} 33.7^{s}	−04° 40′ 14″	5	MCG-01-04-052, PGC 5432, PGC 5439, PGC 5443, PGC 5445	In Cetus
	13	01^{h} 32.4^{m}	−07° 52′	5	MCG-01-05-002, MCG-01-05-003, MCG-01-05-004, PGC 5728, PGC 5741	In Cetus
	14	01^{h} 59^{m} 47^{s}	−07° 01.7′	4	MCG-01-06-017, MCG-01-06-019, MCG-01-06-020, MCG-01-06-022	In Cetus
	15	02^{h} 07^{m} 39.0^{s}	+02° 08′ 18″	6	UGC 1617, UGC 1618, UGC 1618 B, UGC 1620, UGC 1624, MCG+00-06-033	In Cetus
	16	02^{h} 09^{m} 31.3^{s}	−10° 09′ 31″	4	NGC 835, NGC 833, NGC 838, NGC 839	In Cetus. Contains three starburst galaxies, two LINER galaxies, and a Seyfert 2 galaxy
	17	02^{h} 14^{m} 04.5^{s}	+13° 18′ 54″	5	PGC 8558, PGC 8559, PGC 8560, PGC 8561, PGC 8564	In Aries
	18	02^{h} 39^{m} 06.10^{s}	+18° 23′ 02.0″	4	MCG+03-07-038, UGC 2140	In Aries
	19	02^{h} 42^{m} 45^{s}	−12° 24.7′	4	MCG-02-07-073, MCG-02-07-074, MCG-02-07-075, PGC 10269	In Cetus
HCG 20 seen by PANSTARRS DR1 Color	20	02^{h} 44^{m} 14^{s}	+26° 06.2′	6	PGC 10364, PGC 10365, PGC 10366, PGC 10367, PGC 10368, PGC 10369	In Aries
	21	02^{h} 45^{m} 16.9^{s}	−17° 37′ 35″	5	NGC 1099, NGC 1100, NGC 1098, NGC 1091, NGC 1092	In Eridanus
	22	03^{h} 03^{m} 31^{s}	−15° 40.5′	5	NGC 1199, NGC 1190, NGC 1189, NGC 1191, NGC 1192	In Eridanus
	23	03^{h} 07^{m} 06^{s}	−09° 35.1′	5	NGC 1214, NGC 1215, NGC 1216, MCG-02-08-054	In Eridanus
	24	03^{h} 20.3^{m}	−10° 51′	5	MCG-02-09-031, MCG-02-09-032, PGC 12472, PGC 12492, PGC 12489	In Eridanus
	25	03^{h} 20^{m} 43.7^{s}	−01° 03′ 07″	7	UGC 2690, UGC 2691, PGC 12524, PGC 12530, PGC 12533, PGC 12538, PGC 12550	In Cetus
	26	03^{h} 21^{m} 54^{s}	−13° 38.8′	7	MCG-02-09-035, HCG 26b, PGC 12604, PGC 12605, PGC 12610, PGC 12613, PGC 12615	In Eridanus
	27	04^{h} 19.4^{m}	−11° 42′	6	PGC 14861, PGC 14862, PGC 14863, PGC 14866, PGC 14870, PGC 14873	In Eridanus
	28	04^{h} 27^{m} 19^{s}	−10° 19.0′	4	PGC 15135, PGC 15136, PGC 15141, HCGd 28d	In Eridanus
	29	04^{h} 34^{m} 45^{s}	−30° 32.8′	4	PGC 15559, PGC 15560, PGC 15561, PGC 15562	In Eridanus, immediately west of υ^{2} Eridani (Upsilon^{2} Eridani)
	30	04^{h} 36.5^{m}	−02° 49′	4	MCG+00-12-051, MCG+00-12-054, PGC 15624, PGC 15636	In Eridanus
	31	05^{h} 01^{m} 37^{s}	−04° 15.4′	4	NGC 1741A, PGC 16570, NGC 1741B, PGC 16571	In Eridanus
	32	05^{h} 01.7^{m}	−15° 25′	4	MCG-03-13-053, PGC 16578, PGC 16584, PGC 16587	In Lepus, westnorthwest of planetary nebula Abell 7, southeast of R Leporis (Hind's Crimson Star)
HCG 33 seen by PANSTARRS DR1 Color	33	05^{h} 10^{m} 47.6^{s}	+18° 01′ 11″	4	PGC 16863, PGC 16866, PGC 16867, PGC 16871	In Taurus
	34	05^{h} 21^{m} 47^{s}	+06° 40.6′	4	NGC 1875, VV 169b, VV 169c, VV 169d	In Orion, half a degree southsouthwest of Dolidze 17 (asterism Metronome)
	35	08^{h} 45^{m} 20.71^{s}	+44° 32′ 23.1″	6	PGC 24596, PGC 24597, PGC 24598, PGC 24599, PGC 24600, PGC 24601	In Lynx
	36	09^{h} 09^{m} 24^{s}	+15° 47.7′	4	IC 528, IC 528C, PGC 25782, PGC 25791	In Cancer
	37	09^{h} 13^{m} 35.6^{s}	+30° 00′ 51″	5	NGC 2783, UGC 4856, MCG+05-22-016, MCG+05-22-018, MCG+05-22-020,	In Cancer
	38	09^{h} 27.6^{m}	+12° 16′	4	MCG+02-24-012, UGC 5044, MCG+02-24-014, PGC 26830	In Leo
	39	09^{h} 29^{m} 28^{s}	−01° 20.7′	4	PGC 26925, PGC 26926, PGC 26929, PGC 26931	In Hydra
	40	09^{h} 38^{m} 54^{s}	−04° 51.1′	6	MCG-01-25-008, MCG-01-25-009, MCG-01-25-010, MCG-01-25-011, MCG-01-25-012, PGC 27517	In Hydra, also known as Arp 321
	41	09^{h} 57^{m} 40^{s}	+45° 14.4′	4	UGC 5345, UGC 5346, MCG+08-18-046, PGC 28784	In Ursa Major
	42	10^{h} 00^{m} 13.1^{s}	−19° 38′ 24″	4	NGC 3091, NGC 3096, MCG-03-26-006, PGC 28926	In Hydra, also known as NGC 3091 Group
	43	10^{h} 11.2^{m}	−00° 01′	6	Z 8-59, Z 8-61, Z 8-62, PGC 29666, PGC 29668, PGC 29673	In Sextans, less than one degree eastnortheast of α Sextantis (Alpha Sextantis)
	44	10^{h} 18^{m} 00^{s}	+21° 48.7′	4	NGC 3185, NGC 3187, NGC 3190, NGC 3193	In Leo
	45	10^{h} 19.2^{m}	+59° 06′	4	UGC 5564, PGC 30137, PGC 30143, PGC 30156	In Ursa Major
	46	10^{h} 22.0^{m}	+17° 48′	4	MCG+03-27-005, MCG+03-27-007, MCG+03-27-008, MCG+03-27-009	In Leo
	47	10^{h} 25^{m} 48^{s}	+13° 43.9′	4	UGC 5644, MCG+02-27-013, MCG+02-27-014, MCG+02-27-015	In Leo
	48	10^{h} 37^{m} 45.6^{s}	−27° 04′ 50″	4	IC 2597, ESO 501-59, PGC 31577, PGC 31580	In Hydra
	49	10^{h} 56^{m} 36^{s}	+67° 10.8′	4	PGC 32890, PGC 32893, PGC 32895, PGC 32899	In Ursa Major
	50	11^{h} 17^{m} 06^{s}	+54° 55.1′	5	PGC 34444, PGC 34447, PGC 34448, PGC 34452, PGC 34453	In Ursa Major, half a degree eastsoutheast of Messier 97 (Owl nebula)
	51	11^{h} 22^{m} 21.6^{s}	+24° 19′ 41″	7	NGC 3651, NGC 3653, IC 2759, MCG+04-27-030, MCG+04-27-027, PGC 34899, PGC 34901	In Leo
	52	11^{h} 26.3^{m}	+21° 05′	4	MCG+04-27-036, PGC 35178, PGC 35179, PGC 35184,	In Leo
	53	11^{h} 28^{m} 58^{s}	+20° 46.6′	4	NGC 3697, Mrk 1296, MCG+04-27-044, PGC 35381	In Leo
	54	11^{h} 29^{m} 15^{s}	+20° 34.7′	4	IC 700	In Leo
	55	11^{h} 32^{m} 07^{s}	+70° 48.7′	5	PGC 35573, PGC 35574, PGC 35575, 2MASX J11320571+7048236, HCG 55e	In Draco, half a degree northwest of NGC 3735
	56	11^{h} 32^{m} 32^{s}	+52° 56.9′	5	MCG+09-19-113, Mrk 176, PGC 35609, PGC 35615, PGC 35618	In Ursa Major, south of NGC 3718 and a popular target for amateur astronomers
	57	11^{h} 37^{m} 50.5^{s}	+21° 59′ 06″	8	NGC 3753, NGC 3746, NGC 3750, NGC 3754, NGC 3748, NGC 3751, NGC 3745, PGC 36010	In Leo, also known as Copeland Septet
	58	11^{h} 42^{m} 09.4^{s}	+10° 16′ 30″	5	NGC 3817, NGC 3819, NGC 3820, NGC 3822, NGC 3825,	In Leo and Virgo
	59	11^{h} 48^{m} 27^{s}	+12° 43.0′	5	IC 737, IC 736, PGC 36871, PGC 36867, PGC 36851	In Leo
	60	12^{h} 03^{m} 05^{s}	+51° 41.6′	4	MCG+09-20-071, PGC 38053, PGC 38064, PGC 38072	In Ursa Major
	61	12^{h} 12^{m} 24^{s}	+29° 10.7′	4	NGC 4169, NGC 4170, NGC 4174, NGC 4175	In Coma Berenices, also known as Box galaxies
	62	12^{h} 53^{m} 05.6^{s}	−09° 12′ 21″	4	NGC 4759, NGC 4761, NGC 4764, NGC 4776, NGC 4778	In Virgo
	63	13^{h} 02.2^{m}	−32° 46′	4	ESO 381-50, ESO 443-37, PGC 44959, PGC 44979	In Centaurus
	64	13^{h} 25^{m} 43^{s}	−03° 51.5′	4	PGC 46971, PGC 46972, PGC 46975, PGC 46977,	In Virgo
	65	13^{h} 29^{m} 53^{s}	−29° 30.0′	5	ESO 444-55, PGC 47401, PGC 47403, PGC 47406, PGC 47407	In Hydra
	66	13^{h} 38^{m} 33^{s}	+57° 18.3′	4	MCG+10-19-104, PGC 48220, PGC 48231, PGC 48222	In Ursa Major
	67	13^{h} 49^{m} 03.5^{s}	−07° 12′ 20″	4	NGC 5306, MCG-01-35-013, MCG-01-35-015, PGC 49036	In Virgo
	68	13^{h} 53^{m} 40.9^{s}	+40° 19′ 07″	5	NGC 5350, NGC 5353, NGC 5354, NGC 5355, NGC 5358	In Canes Venatici
	69	13^{h} 55^{m} 31^{s}	+25° 03.8′	4	UGC 8842, Z 132-48, MCG+04-33-028, PGC 49499	In Bootes, HCG 69 is surrounded by other galaxies, such as IC 4343, IC 4344, IC 4345, IC 4346, IC 4348 and IC 4349
	70	14^{h} 04^{m} 07.4^{s}	+33° 19′ 10″	7	IC 4369, IC 4370, IC 4371, UGC 8990, MCG+06-31-057, MCG+06-31-065, PGC 50123	In Canes Venatici
	71	14^{h} 11.1^{m}	+25° 29′	4	NGC 5008, IC 4382, PGC 50640, PGC 50641	In Bootes
	72	14^{h} 47^{m} 55^{s}	+19° 03.6′	6	UGC 9532, MCG+03-38-017, MCG+03-38-018, MCG+03-38-018, MCG+03-38-020, MCG+03-38-022	In Bootes
	73	15^{h} 02^{m} 40.1^{s}	+23° 21′ 13″	5	NGC 5829, IC 4526, PGC 53702, PGC 53703, PGC 53720	In Bootes
	74	15^{h} 19^{m} 28^{s}	+20° 53.6′	5	NGC 5910, MCG+04-36-036, PGC 54692, PGC 54694, PGC 54697	In Serpens Caput
	75	15^{h} 21^{m} 37.0^{s}	+21° 10′ 50″	6	PGC 54802, PGC 54803, PGC 54804, PGC 54818, PGC 54824, PGC 54827	In Serpens Caput
	76	15^{h} 31.7^{m}	+07° 18′	5	NGC 5941, NGC 5942, NGC 5944, MCG+01-40-003, PGC 55313, PGC 55325	In Serpens Caput
	77	15^{h} 49^{m} 17^{s}	+21° 49.7′	4	UGC 10049, PGC 56121, PGC 56122, PGC 56125	In Serpens Caput
	78	15^{h} 48.5^{m}	+68° 12′	4	UGC 10057, MCG+11-19-016, PGC 56086, PGC 56095	In Draco
	79	15^{h} 59^{m} 13^{s}	+20° 45.1′	5	NGC 6027, NGC 6027a, NGC 6027b, NGC 6027c, NGC 6027d, NGC 6027e (tidal tail of NGC 6027)	In Serpens Caput, also known as UGC 10116, VV 115, Seyfert's Sextet or Serpens Sextet. Contains 2 lenticular galaxies, 3 spiral galaxies (one barred spiral) and a tidal tail.
	80	15^{h} 59^{m} 12^{s}	+65° 13.6′	4	PGC 56572, PGC 56577, PGC 56588, PGC 56590	In Draco
	81	16^{h} 18^{m} 13^{s}	+12° 47.6′	4	SDSS J161813.66+124811.2, PGC 57774, PGC 57777, PGC 57779	In Hercules
	82	16^{h} 28^{m} 22.1^{s}	+32° 49′ 25″	4	NGC 6161, NGC 6162, NGC 6163, PGC 58231	In Hercules
	83	16^{h} 35^{m} 40.9^{s}	+06° 16′ 12″	5	PGC 58559, PGC 58561, PGC 58562, PGC 58565, PGC 58569	In Hercules
	84	16^{h} 44^{m} 08^{s}	+77° 50.2′	6	PGC 58856, PGC 58861, PGC 58873, PGC 58877, PGC 58881, PGC 58884	In Ursa Minor
	85	18^{h} 50^{m} 22.3^{s}	+73° 21′ 00″	4	PGC 62476, PGC 62477, PGC 62478, PGC 62484,	In Draco
	86	19^{h} 51^{m} 59.2^{s}	−30° 49′ 34″	4	ESO 461-7, MCG-05-47-001, MCG-05-47-002, MCG-05-47-003,	In Sagittarius
	87	20^{h} 48^{m} 11^{s}	−19° 50.4′	4	ESO 597-36, PGC 65409, ESO 597-35, PGC 65414	In Capricornus, one of the most compact groups, hosting two active galactic nuclei and a starburst among its three members, all of which show signs of interaction
	88	20^{h} 52.4^{m}	−05° 45′	4	NGC 6978, NGC 6976, NGC 6977, MCG-01-53-014	In Aquarius
	89	21^{h} 20.2^{m}	−03° 54′	4	MCG-01-54-012, PGC 66574, PGC 66575, PGC 66580	In Aquarius
	90	22^{h} 02^{m} 06.3^{s}	−31° 55′ 48″	4	NGC 7173, NGC 7174, NGC 7176, and NGC 7172	In Piscis Austrinus, also called NGC 7176 Group
HCG 91 by PANSTARRS DR1 Color	91	22^{h} 09^{m} 00.8^{s}	−27° 47′ 36″	4	NGC 7214, ESO 467-15, ESO 467-13, HCG 91d	In Piscis Austrinus, also called VV 700 Group
	92	22^{h} 35^{m} 57.5^{s}	+33° 57′ 36″	5	NGC 7317, NGC 7318A, NGC 7318B, NGC 7319, NGC 7320C	In Pegasus, also called Stephan's Quintet, one galaxy of the fivesome, NGC 7320, is not part of the HCG but is a foreground galaxy in front of the other four galaxies in the HCG. When discovered, two of the galaxies in the grouping were considered to be one galaxy, NGC 7318.
	93	23^{h} 15^{m} 12.2^{s}	+18° 59′ 31″	5	NGC 7547, NGC 7549, NGC 7550, NGC 7553, NGC 7558	In Pegasus
	94	23^{h} 17^{m} 16.5^{s}	+18° 43′ 11″	7	NGC 7578, UGC 12477, PGC 70936, PGC 70937, PGC 70939, PGC 70941, PGC 70943,	In Pegasus
	95	23^{h} 19^{m} 32^{s}	+09° 29.5′	4	NGC 7609, MCG+01-59-046, PGC 71077, PGC 71080	In Pegasus, also called Arp 150 Group and NGC 7609 Group
	96	23^{h} 27^{m} 58^{s}	+08° 46.4′	4	NGC 7674, NGC 7674A, NGC 7675, PGC 71507	In Pegasus, immediately north of HD 220965
	97	23^{h} 47^{m} 24.0^{s}	−02° 19′ 08″	5	IC 5351, IC 5352, IC 5356, IC 5357, IC 5359	In Pisces, northnorthwest of 20 Piscium
	98	23^{h} 54.2^{m}	+00° 22′	4	NGC 7783, MCG+00-60-059, PGC 72810, NGC 7783 C	In Pisces. In 2019 a giant tidal tail and a large envelope was discovered around HCG 98 with the Wise Observatory
	99	00^{h} 00^{m} 43^{s}	+28° 23.7′	4	UGC 12897, UGC 12899, MCG+05-01-021, PGC 60, PGC 57	In Pegasus, west of HD 224895
	100	00^{h} 01.3^{m}	+13° 07′	4	NGC 7803, Mrk 934, MCG+02-01-009, MCG+02-01-010	In Pegasus

== Distribution of Hickson Compact Groups ==
Chart of Hickson Compact Groups

== Gallery ==
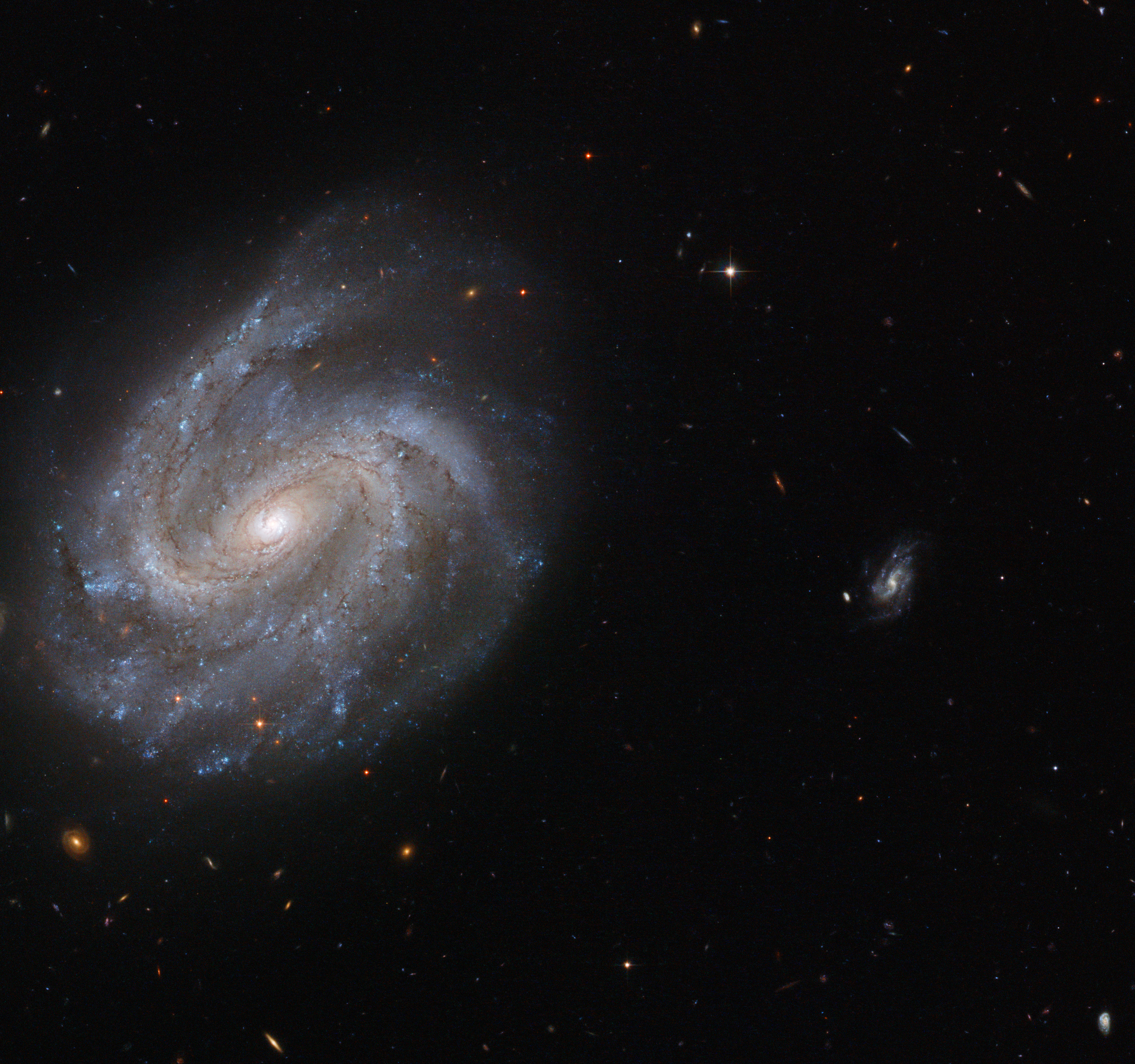
NGC 201 is a barred spiral galaxy similar to the Milky Way, a member of HCG 7

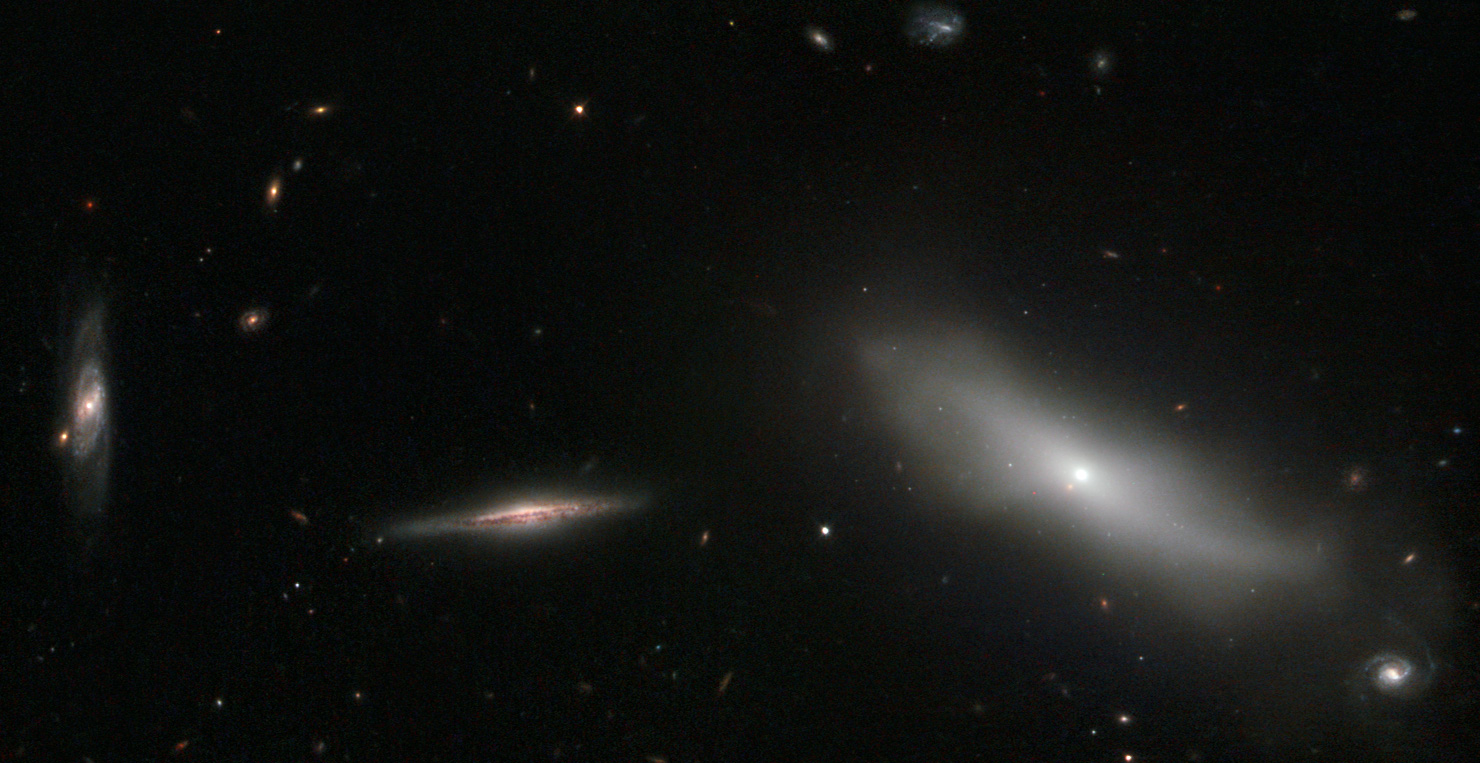
HCG 22 by Hubble Space Telescope

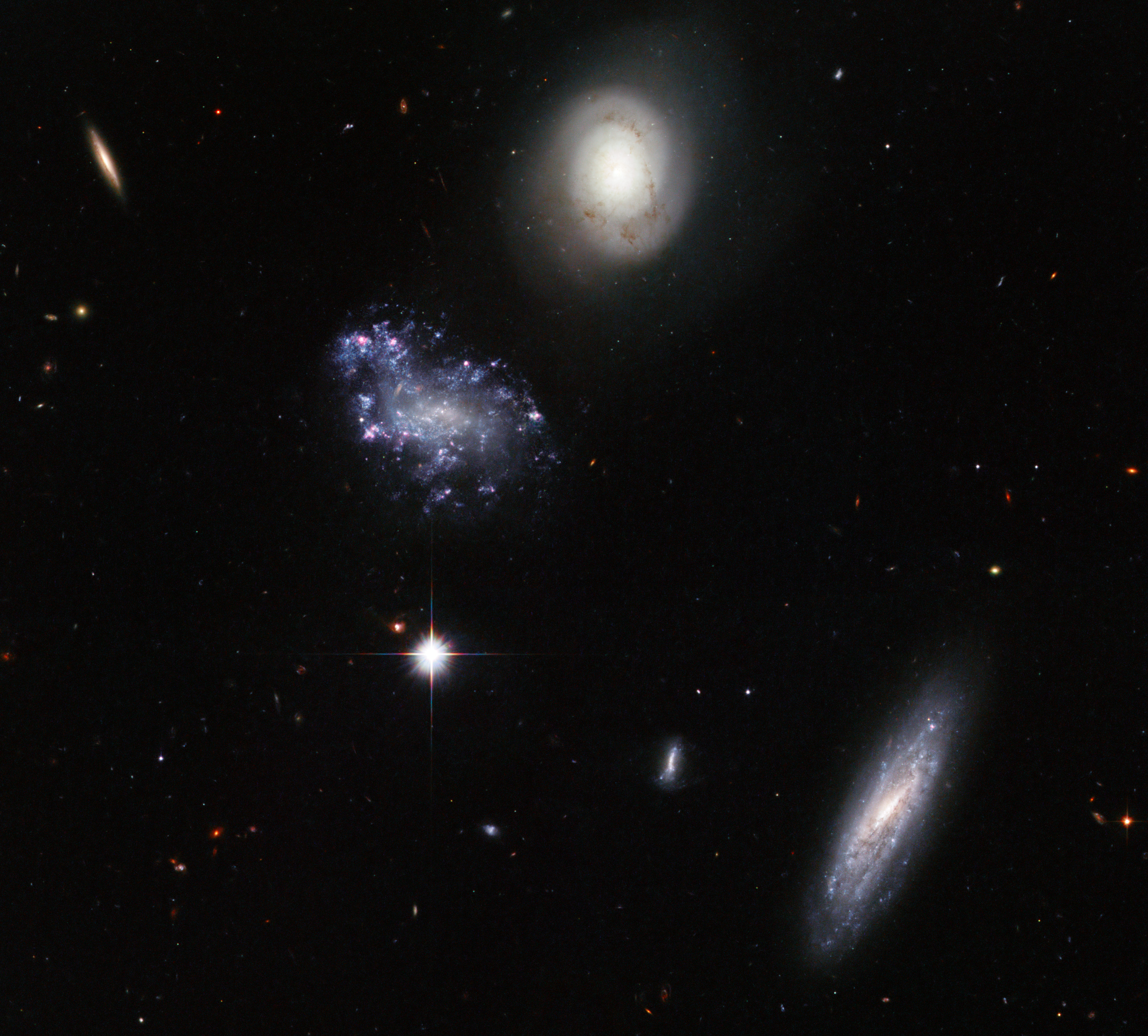
Hickson Compact Group 59 by Hubble Space Telescope

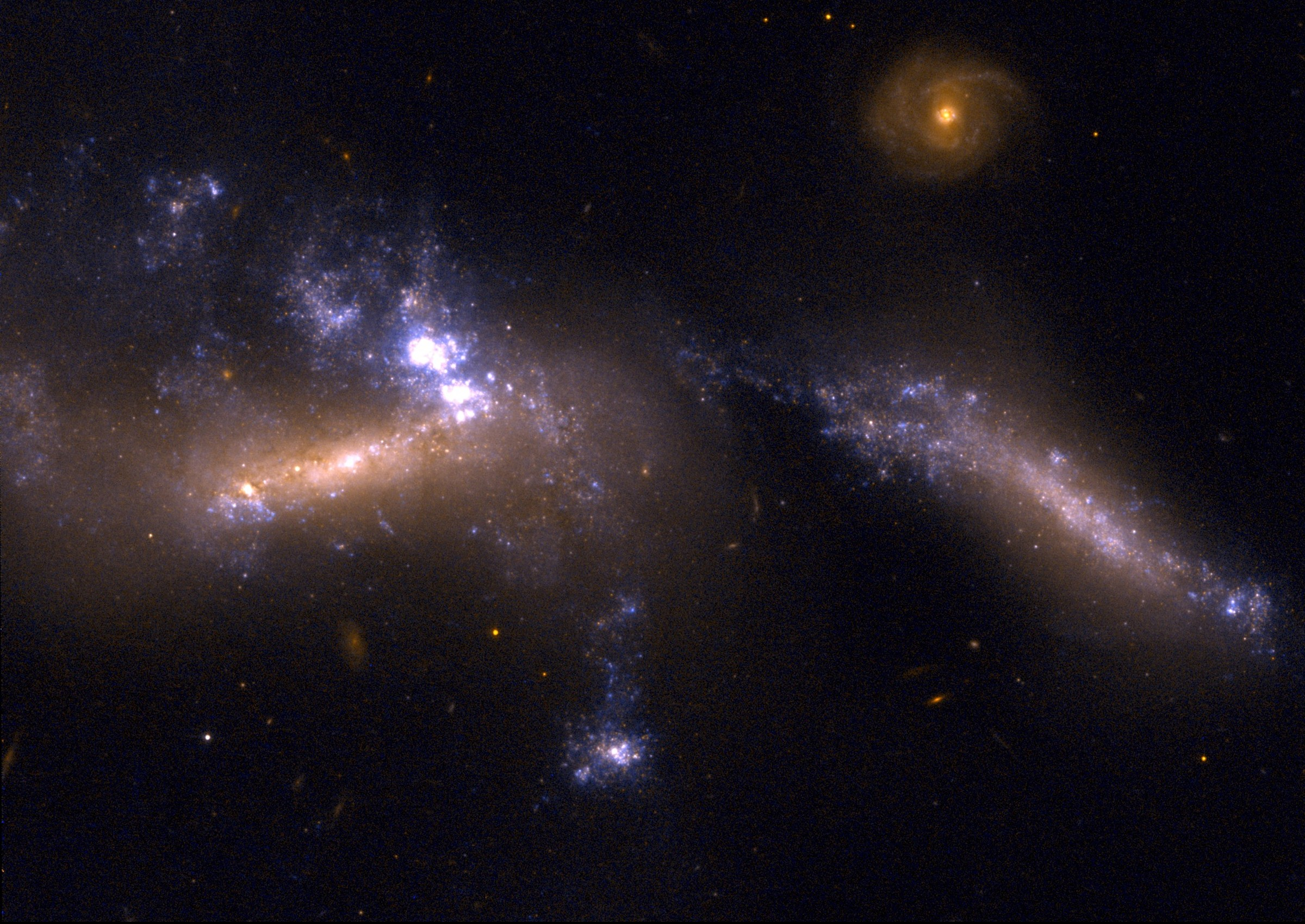
HCG 31 by Hubble Space Telescope

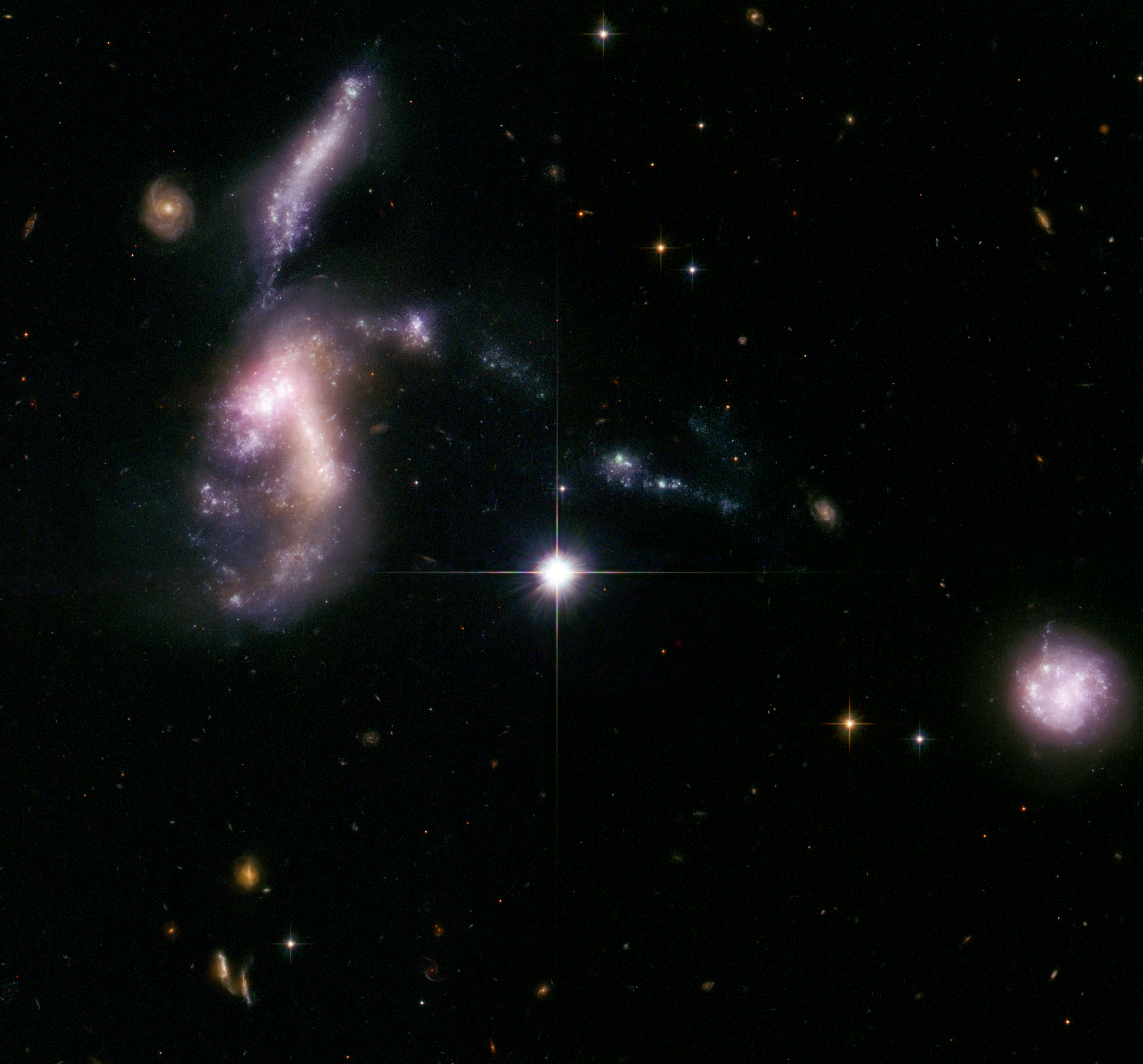
HCG 31

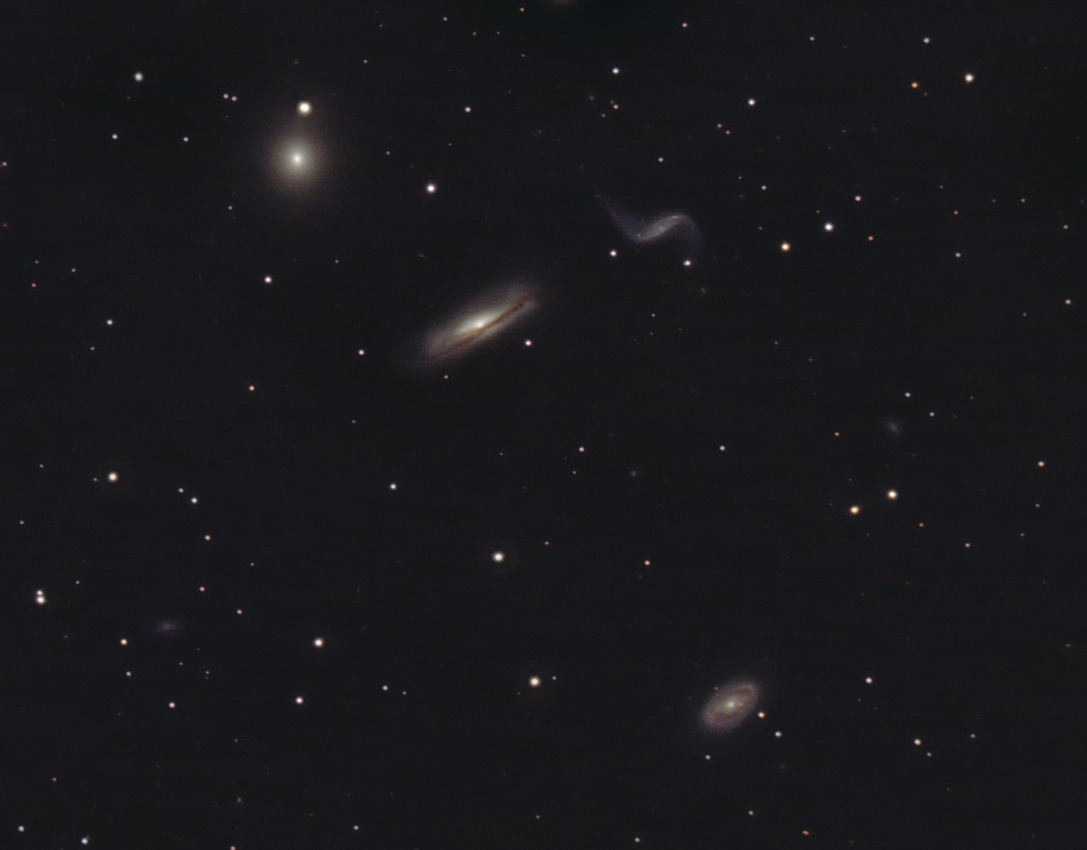
The four members of HCG 44 by Hunter Wilson

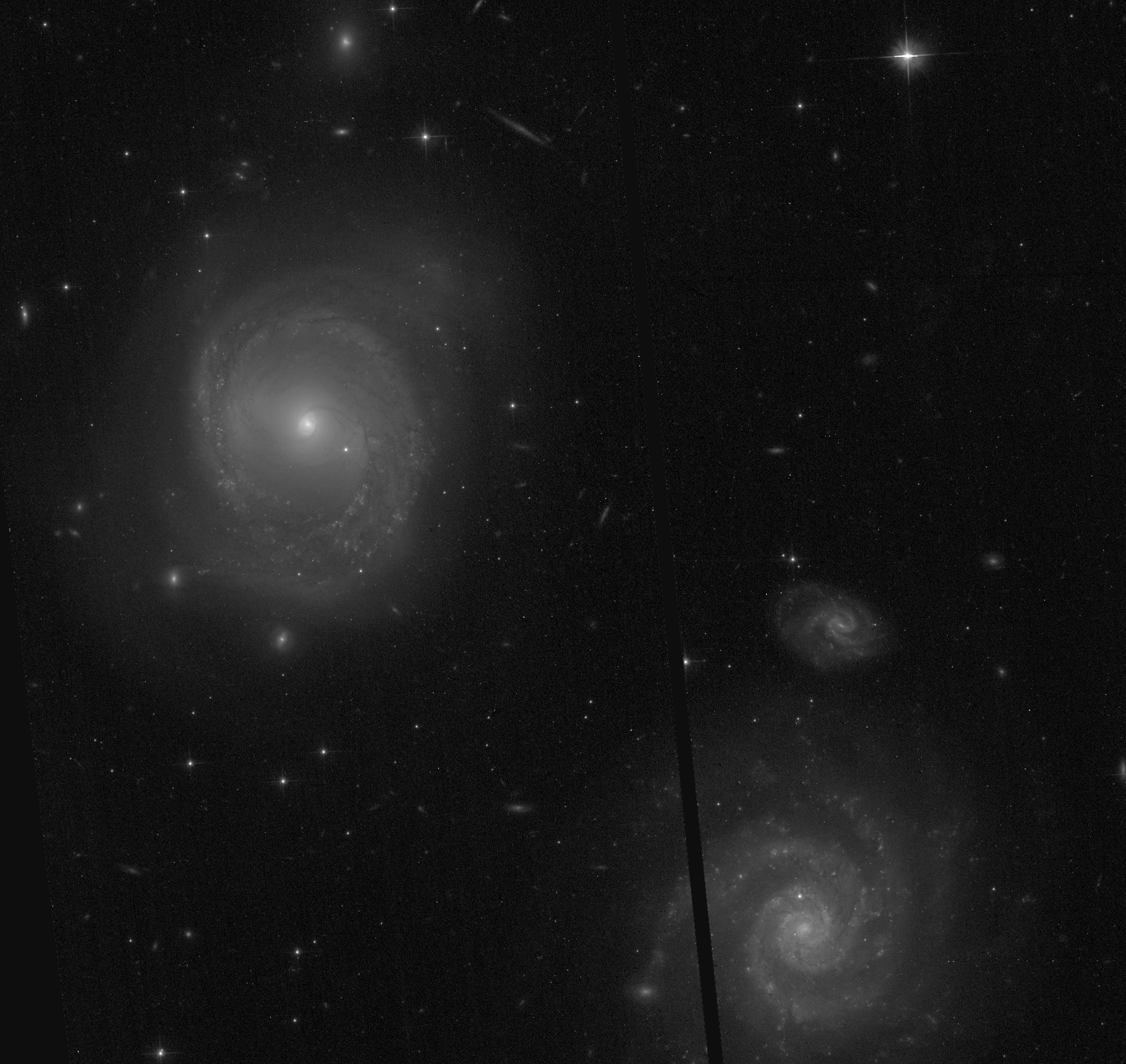
NGC 6976 (lower right) and NGC 6977 (left) are part of HCG 88. Hubble image

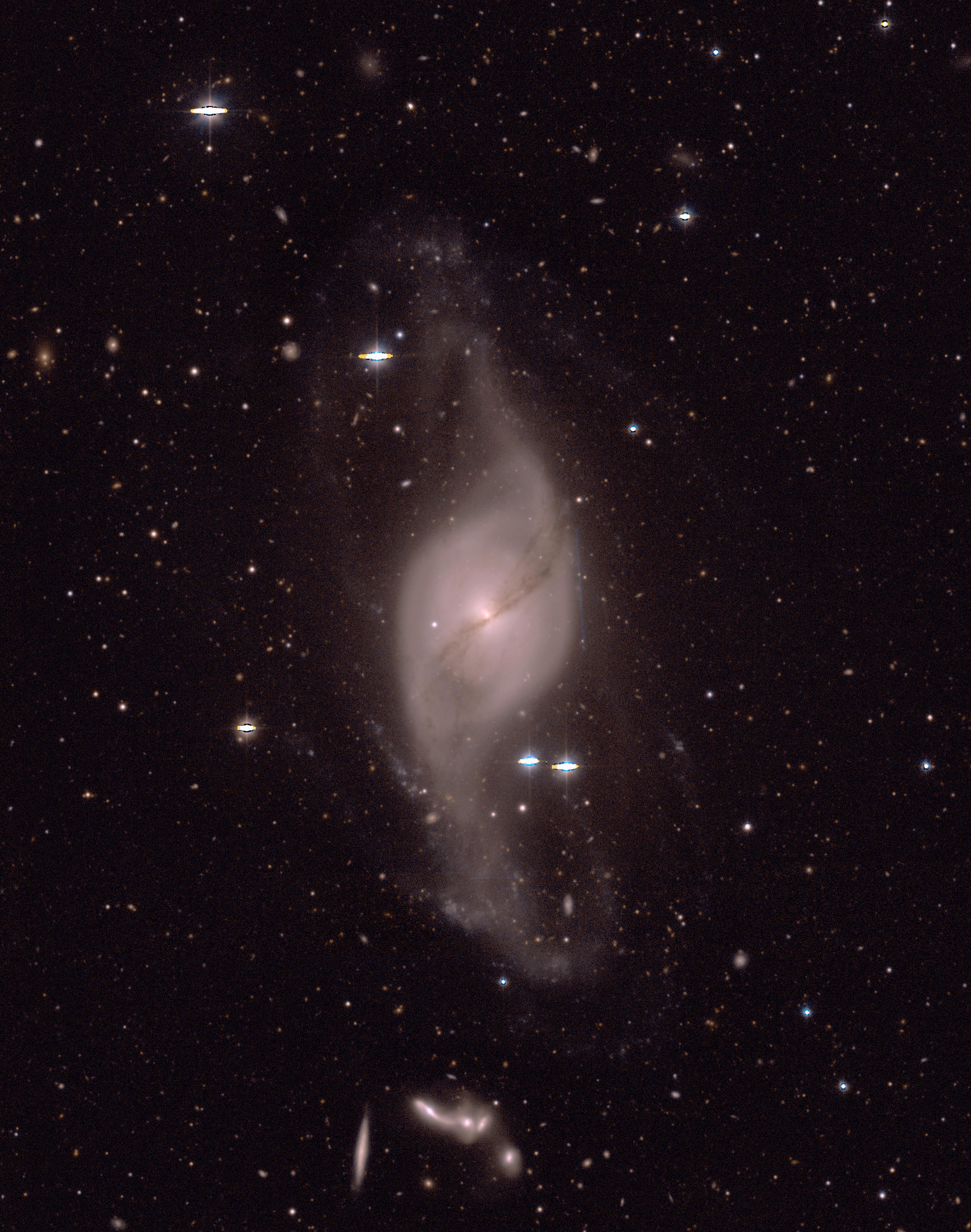
NGC 3718 and HCG 56 (bottom). Image from the legacy surveys

== See also ==
- Abell catalogue
- Catalogue of Galaxies and Clusters of Galaxies
