= NGC 536 =

Galaxy in the constellation Andromeda

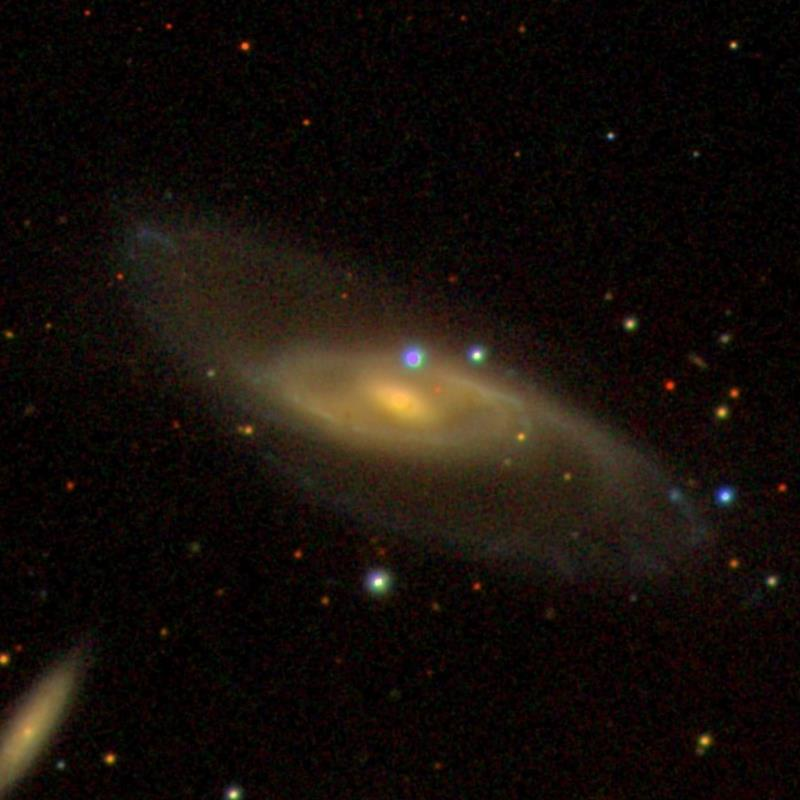
- NGC 536 imaged by SDSS

Observation data (J2000 epoch)
- Constellation: Andromeda
- Right ascension: 01^{h} 26^{m} 21.8^{s}
- Declination: +34° 42′ 11″
- Redshift: 0.017309 +/- 0.000017
- Heliocentric radial velocity: 5,189 ± 5 km/s
- Distance: 198 ± 34 Mly (60.7 ± 10.6 Mpc)
- Apparent magnitude (V): 12.4

Characteristics
- Type: SB(r)b
- Apparent size (V): 3.0′ × 1.1′

Other designations
- UGC 1013, MCG +06-04-021, PGC 5344

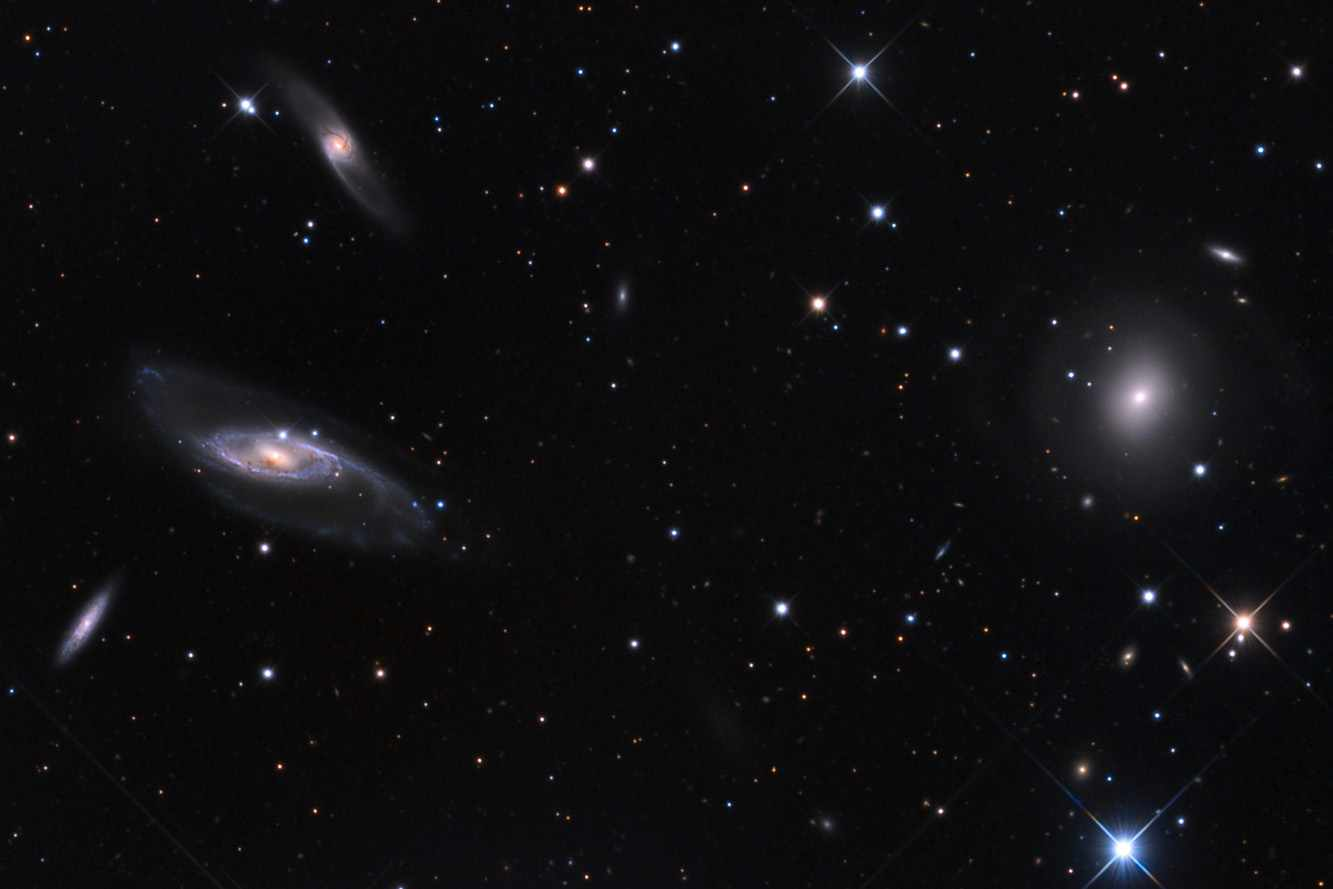
Hickson Compact Group 10 by Adam Block/Mount Lemmon SkyCenter

NGC 536 is a barred spiral galaxy located in the constellation Andromeda. It is located at a distance of circa 200 million light-years from Earth, which, given its apparent dimensions, means that NGC 536 is about 180,000 light years across. It was discovered by William Herschel on September 13, 1784. It is a member of Hickson Compact Group 10, which also includes the galaxies NGC 529, NGC 531, and NGC 542. It belongs to the Perseus–Pisces Supercluster.

The nucleus of NGC 536 is characterised as a low-ionization nuclear emission-line region (LINER), a type of active galactic nucleus. The galaxy features a bright inner region, surrounded by a ring from which emanate two faint arms with H II regions. These extended spiral arms have been suggested to be tidal tails. The galaxy has very weak Hα emission. The star formation rate in NGC 536 is estimated to be 1.16 – 1.25 M_{☉} per year. The galaxy is seen with inclination of 78 degrees.

One supernova has been observed in NGC 536. SN 1963N (type unknown, mag. 17.7) was discovered by Howard S. Gates on 27 June 1963, as part of the 1963 Palomar Supernova Search.

== See also ==
- List of NGC objects (1–1000)
