= HCG 5 =

Galaxy group in the Pisces constellation

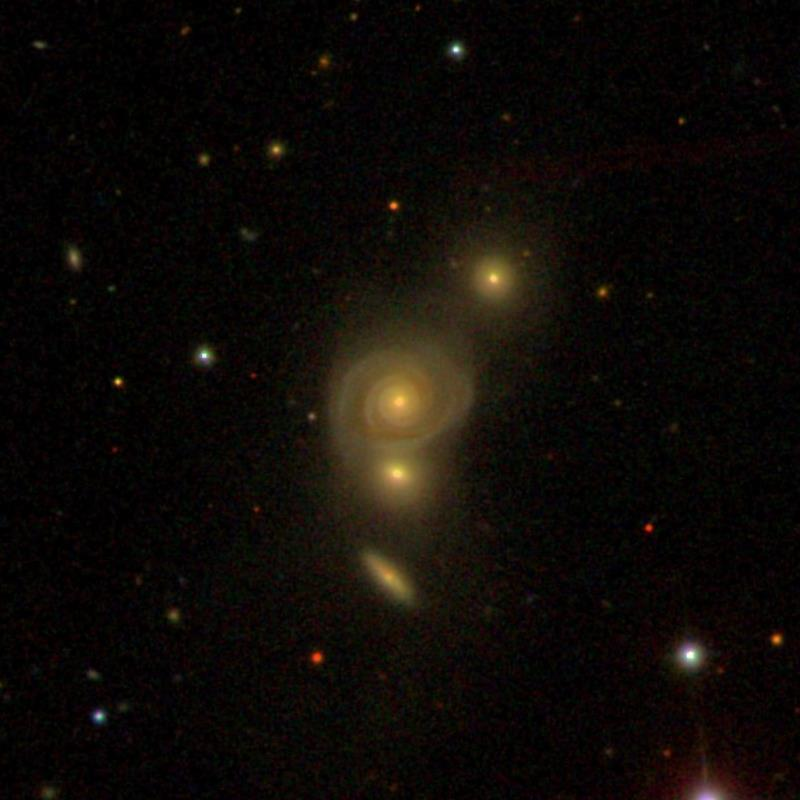
- HCG 5 as seen by SDSS

Observation data (Epoch J2000)
- Constellation: Pisces
- Right ascension: 00^{h} 38^{m} 54.3^{s}
- Declination: +07° 03′ 36.0″
- Number of galaxies: 4
- Velocity dispersion: 147.9 km/s
- Redshift: 0.041100
- Distance: 576.1 Mly (176.64 Mpc) `

Other designations
- III Zw 010; CGCG 409-051; CGCG 0036.3+0646; CGPG 0036.3+0646

Hickson Compact Group 5 is a compact group of galaxies located in the constellation Pisces. It was identified using a systematic search by Palomar Observatory under a research of compact groups led by astronomer Paul Hickson. In this group, only three members are interacting, HCG 5A, 5B, 5C, while HCG 5D is much closer to the Milky Way and has a much lower velocity than the rest of the group, indicating it is likely not interacting with the other galaxies in the group and it is not part of the merger.

HCG 5 is considered to be part of a larger galaxy group, known as Abell 76 or ACO 76. It has a few known galaxy members such as IC 1565, IC 1566 and IC 1569.

== Properties ==
HCG 5 has a mean redshift of approximately 0.04, having a distance of 570 million light years, and it is located at a galactic latitude (gal z) of 0.04. A study suggests that HCG 5A is the brightest member in the group, having absolute magnitude of 20.7, followed by HCG 5B, HCG 5C and HCG 5D, with an absolute magnitude of 19.9, 19.2 and 18.7 respectively.

Another study suggests that HCG 5A is the luminous galaxy in the group, as HCG 5A has a blue minus red (B-R) and corrected total blue magnitude ($B_{TC}$) of 14.55 and 1.58, signifying that it is a luminous galaxy and has a large amount of interstellar dust and is undergoing vigorous amount of star birth and star formation. In contrast, HCG 5B is the reddest galaxy in this group, having a 2.03 (B-R), displaying that it is a galaxy populated with old, ageing stars and is currently not undergoing high amounts of star formation. HCG 5B also has a Radial Velocity of 12489 km/s (another study suggests 11944 km/s), and a velocity dispersion of 205.6 km/s, indicating it is a relatively massive galaxy, containing a high amount of dark matter.

HCG 5 has a radial velocity dispersion (km/s) of 147.9 (another paper suggests 174) and a crossing time (H_{0}t_{c}) of 0.0132, suggesting that this group is undergoing rapid evolution and each member of the group is travelling at moderate speeds. This group also has a median galaxy separation of 25.7 kpc and a mass-to-light ratio (M_{☉}/L_{☉}) of 19.95, indicating it is a very dense group and has a moderate amount of dark matter.

== Morphology ==
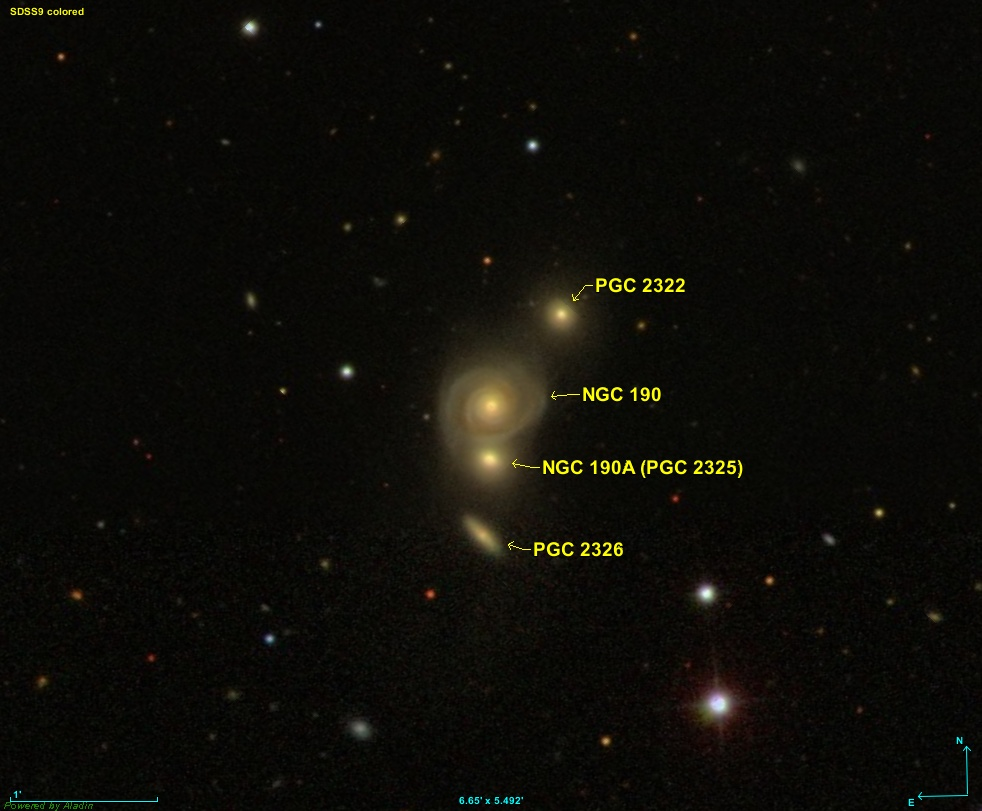
A labeled image of HCG 5. The member galaxies are labeled as A, B, C, and D.

HCG 5A and 5B are currently undergoing a galaxy merger, as HCG 5A has a distorted spiral arm that is caused by gravitational interaction between galaxies. Another study shows that the total out of 4 galaxies, 2 are spiral galaxies, having the spiral fraction of HCG 5 at 0.5 or 50%. A total of 9 foreground stars and 44 foreground galaxies have been detected in the background of galaxy group HCG 5, with 0.2 or 20% of the field galaxies are spiral galaxies. An analysis of the environment around Hickson Compact Group 5 has been conducted, revealing that HCG 5 is relatively isolated and has a low surface density of background objects in the outer field, having a background surface density (σ_O arcmin⁻²) of 0.01762.

HCG 5A, while nearly face-on, has two visible spiral arms, indicating that it is a spiral galaxy, even without a galactic bulge visible. HCG 5A also having a major axis diameter (arcminutes") of 24.40 and a minor axis diameter of 24.30" revealing that it is a proportionately circular galaxy, due to having an ellipticity (ε) of 0.004. On the other hand, HCG 5D is edge-on, and is a lenticular morphology galaxy. It has a major axis diameter and minor axis diameter of 12.30" and 5.0", having an ellipticity (ε) of 0.593, showing that it is a galaxy that has an elongated structure. HCG 5B and 5C are two nearly face-on galaxies, the same as HCG 5A. A study found that HCG 5 may be associated with another large scale structure or a member of a larger galaxy group or cluster.

== Dynamics ==
The radial velocity dispersion of a Hickson Compact Group is determined by the elongation of the group, suggesting that every member is rotating around the gravitational center of the group, proposing that Hickson Compact Groups are dynamically stable.

A 21 cm radio survey has been conducted for HCG 5. The survey data has shown that HCG 5 has an observable neutral hydrogen (HI) content ($log[M(HI)_{obs}]$) of 9.77, and a predicted HI amount ($log[M(HI)_{pred}]$) of 10.05, indicating HCG 5 has a deficient amount of HI gas. This is due to HCG 5 having undergone significant dynamical evolution, as gravitational interaction or gas stripping from other companion galaxies, caused a deficient amount of HI and a moderate amount of spiral galaxies, due to HI gas stripping, transforming from spirals to ellipticals. In another study, using Infrared Astronomical Satellite (IRAS), no far infrared (FIR) is detected, this is common due to deficiency of HI gas.

HCG 5A has a integrated carbon monoxide (CO) intensity ($I_{CO(1-0)}$ [K km/s]) of 5.73 km/s, indicating a significant amount of molecular gas and has a Spread Velocity of Molecular Gas ($\Delta V_{CO(1-0)}$ [km/s]) of 275 km/s, indicating that the gas is rotating around the galaxy at moderate speed.

== Members ==
Hickson Compact Group 5 has a total of 4 galaxy members. Their details are stated in the table below.

Galaxy	Other Names	Type	Right ascension	Declination	Velocity (km/s)	Redshift	B_TC	B−R	Distance (Mpc)	Major Axis Diameter(")	Minor Axis Diameter(")
HCG 5A	NGC 190	Sab	00h 38m 54.6958s	+07° 03′ 45.872″	12147	0.040658	14.55	1.58	174.69	24.40	24.30
HCG 5B	NGC 0190 NED02	E0	00h 38m 54.7290s	+07° 03′ 24.434″	12221	0.040361	15.52	2.03	173.38	17.9	17.5
HCG 5C	MCG+01-02-042	S0	00h 38m 52.7841s	+07° 04′ 22.766″	12489	0.041659	16.26	1.72	179.11	15.10	13.4
HCG 5D	PGC 2326	Sc	00h 38m 54.8860s	+07° 02′ 53.048″	8215	0.027402	16.72	1.68	116.08	12.30	5.0

== Gallery ==
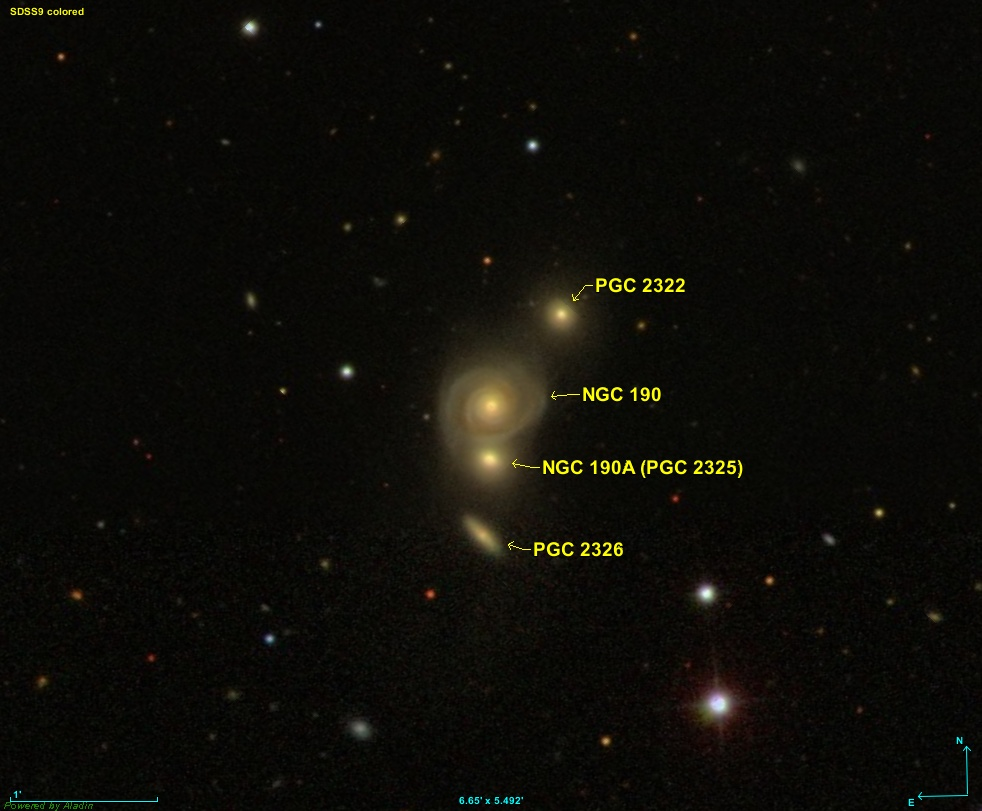
A labeled picture of HCG 5

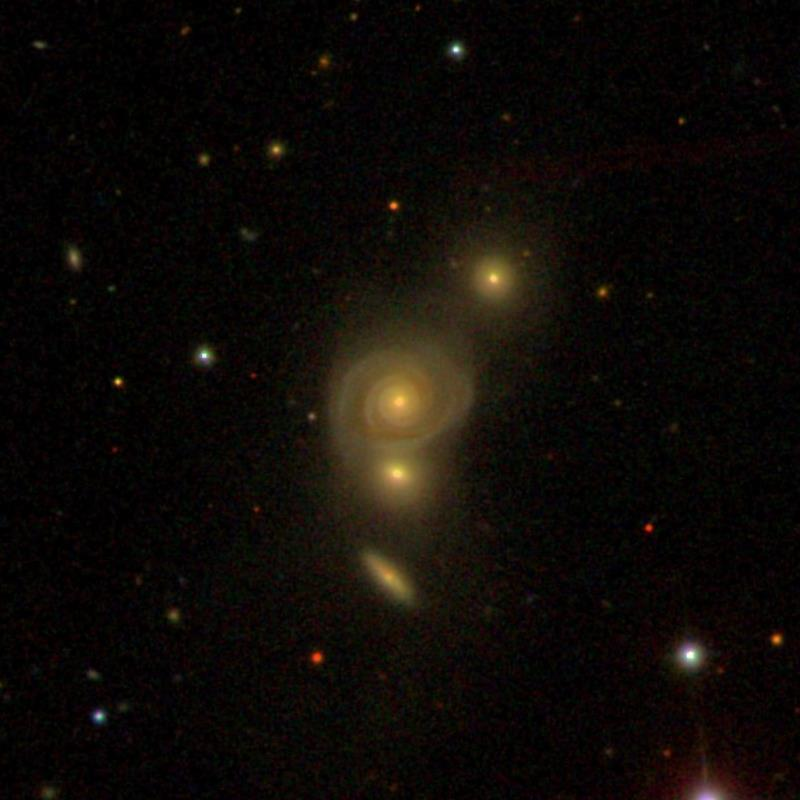
An unlabeled picture of HCG 5
