= NGC 1875 =

Elliptical galaxy in the constellation Orion

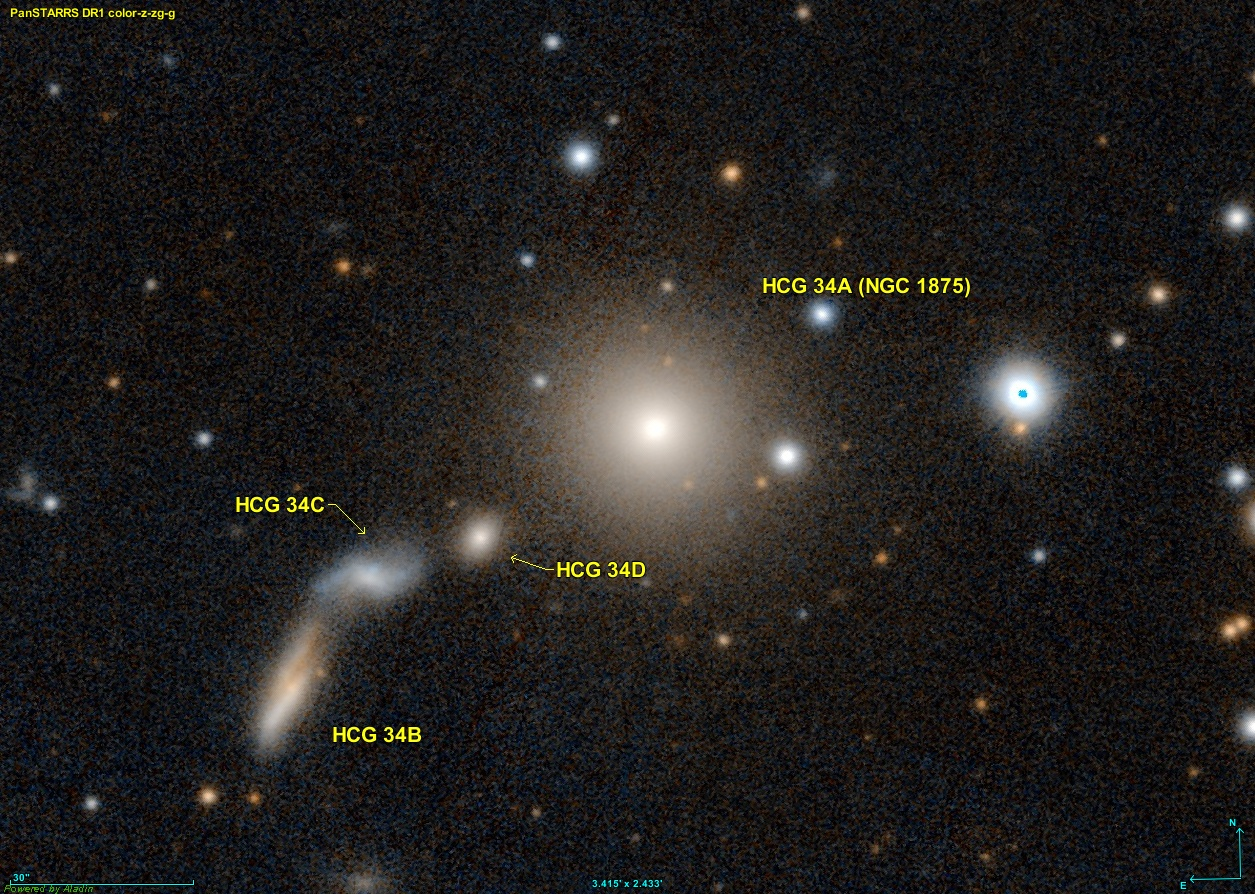
- NGC 1875 within HCG 34 as seen from the Panoramic Survey Telescope And Rapid Response System (Pan-STARRS)

Observation data (J2000 epoch)
- Constellation: Orion
- Right ascension: 05^{h} 21^{m} 45.769^{s}
- Declination: +06° 41′ 19.680″
- Redshift: 0.030475
- Distance: 122.53 Mpc
- Apparent magnitude (B): 14.89

Characteristics
- Size: 0'.710 x 0'.596

Other designations
- NGC 1875, Arp 327, HCG 334

NGC 1875 is an elliptical galaxy in the constellation of Orion, with an apparent (B) magnitude of 14.89. It is the brightest member of HCG 34, which is a Hickson Compact Group of galaxies identified on Palamar Observatory Sky Survey red prints by Paul Hickson in 1982. The other catalogued members of HGC 34 are VV 169b, VV 169c, and VV 169d.
