= IC 2759 =

Elliptical galaxy in the constellation of Leo

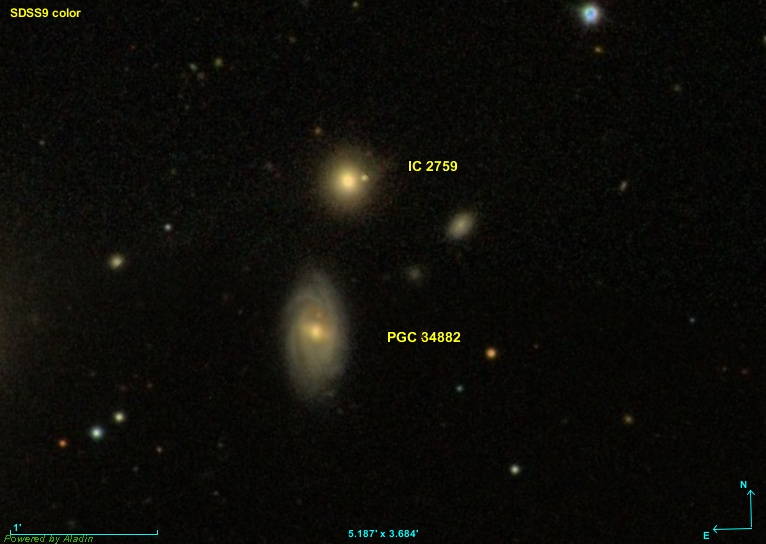
- Sloan Digital Sky Survey image of IC 2759 (above) and PGC 34882 (below)

Observation data (J2000 epoch)
- Constellation: Leo
- Right ascension: 11h 22m 13.280s
- Declination: +24d 19m 01.80s
- Redshift: 0.025684
- Heliocentric radial velocity: 7,700 km/s
- Distance: 350 Mly (107 Mpc)
- Group or cluster: Hickson 51
- Apparent magnitude (V): 15.5

Characteristics
- Type: E, S0?, E2
- Size: 42,000 ly

Other designations
- PGC 34881, ARK 290, CGCG 126-041, MCG +04-27-027, 2MASX J11221325+2419017, HCG 051E, WBL 326-003, 2CXO J112213.2+241901, 2XMM J112213.1+241900, NSA 139264, 2MASS J11221327+2419023, SDSS J112213.28+241901.7, LEDA 34881

IC 2759 is a small type E elliptical galaxy located in the constellation of Leo. It is located 350 million light-years away from the Solar System and was discovered on April 24, 1897, by Guillaume Bigourdan. Sometimes IC 2759 is confused with the spiral galaxy, PGC 34882 which is located south of the galaxy. Both galaxies are members of Hickson 51.

== Supernova ==
One supernova has been discovered in IC 2759 so far: SN 2020lyo.

SN 2020lyo

SN 2020lyo was discovered in IC 2759 by astronomer, Dr. David Bersier on 8 June 2020 from All Sky Automated Survey for SuperNovae (ASAS-SN). via a Liverpool Telescope. It was 0".5 west and 0".0 south of the nucleus and located at redshift of 0.027. The supernova was Type Ia.

== Hickson 51 ==
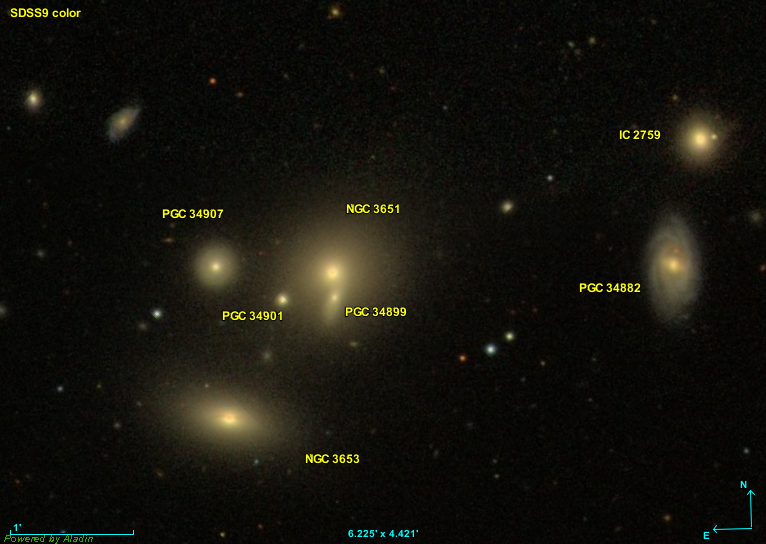
The seven galaxies of Hickson Compact Group 51

IC 2759 is a member of Hickson 51. It was one of the galaxies observed by Paul Hickson, when he published his article in 1982. The other galaxies in Hickson 51, are NGC 3651, PGC 34882, NGC 3653, PGC 34907, PGC 34899 or NGC 3651 NED02 and PGC 34901. IC 2759 in this case, is listed as HCG 51E.
