= HCG 3 =

Compact group of galaxies

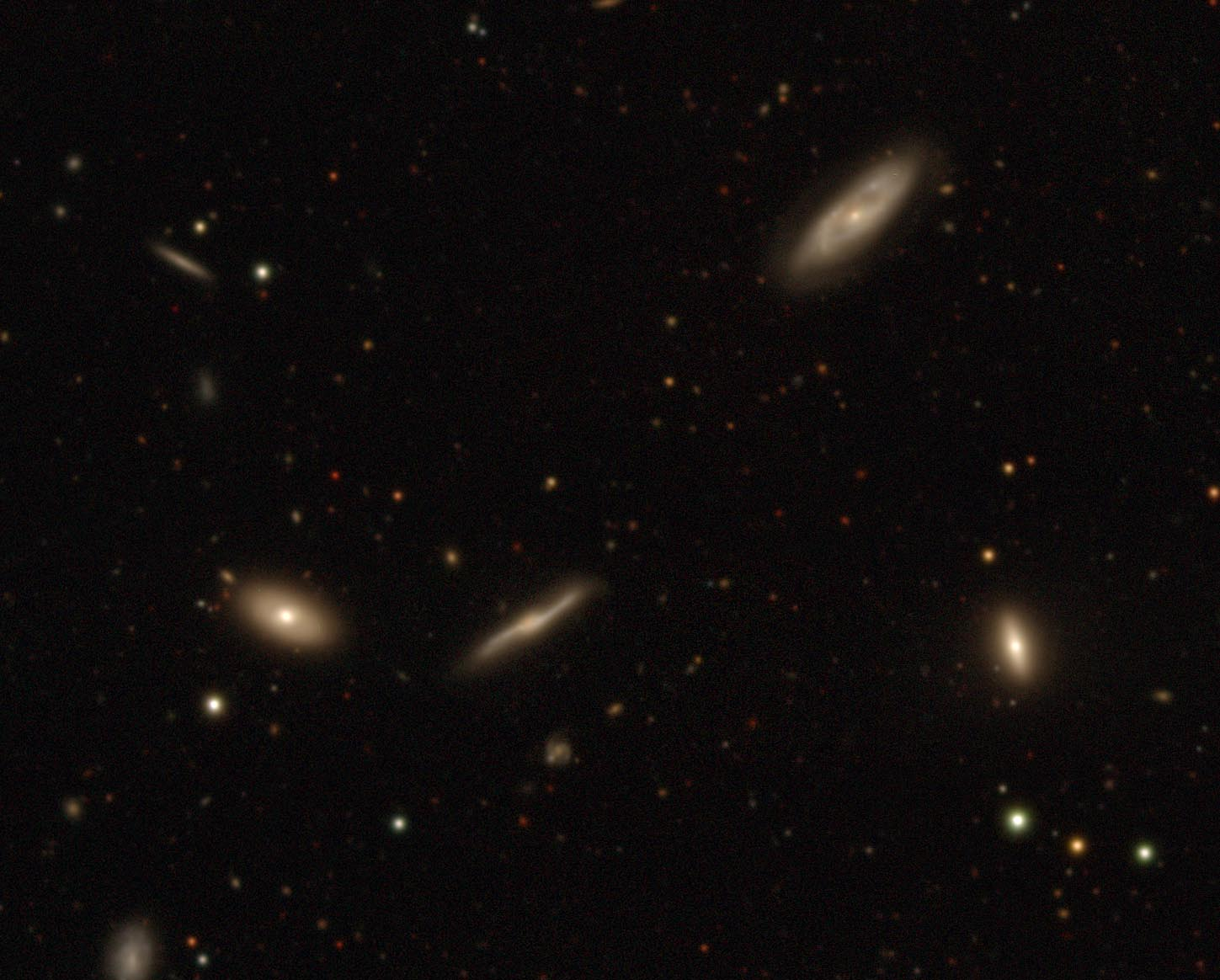
- HCG 3 seen by Legacy Surveys Dr10

Observation data (Epoch J2000)
- Constellation: Cetus
- Right ascension: 00^{h} 34^{m} 28.8000^{s}
- Declination: −07° 34′ 58.800″
- Number of galaxies: 4
- Velocity dispersion: 251.2 km/s
- Redshift: 0.026321
- Distance: 363.4 Mly (111.43 Mpc)

Other designations
- [DZ2015] 471

HCG 3 is a compact group of galaxies from the Hickson Compact Group catalog. It is located in the Constellation Cetus, less than 1 degree north of NGC 157 and is 111.43 ± 7.81 Mega Parsecs away. Hickson Compact Group 3, along with 99 others, was identified by Paul Hickson in 1982. HCG 3 has a radial velocity dispersion of 251 km/s and the crossing time is $H_0t_c$ = 0.023. In this compact group there are only 3 true members, which are HCG 3A, 3B and 3D. HCG 3C is located in the background.

== Properties ==
Far-Infrared Studies by using the Infrared Astronomical Satellite (IRAS) shows that only HCG 3C emits a strong infrared signal, indicating a high amount of star formation and stellar nurseries. Far-infrared astronomy detects thermal radiation of interstellar dust contained in molecular clouds and nebulas, making it a reliable source to detect for massive amount star formation. Far-Infrared Luminosity of HCG 3C is 10.433 L_{☉}, but for HCG 3A, 3B and 3D, their emission is weak or not detected by the satellite.

$B_T$ is the total brightness of the specific galaxy seen through a blue filter. HCG 3A is the brightest of the four, and HCG 3C is the dimmest of the four as shown in the table. B-R is equivalent to blue minus red, which is used to study star formation in the targeted galaxy. HCG 3C has the lowest B-R, indicating a large amount of molecular cloud formation, while HCG 3B has the highest B-R, representing a high amount of old stellar population.

HCG 3C (PGC 2059 or 2MFGC 400) is considered a Low Surface Brightness galaxy (LSB). In the surrounding field of HCG 3, there are a two galaxies appear in the background or foreground, which are MCG 01-02-035 (Seyfert 2 galaxy) and LEDA 138198 (Emission Line galaxy).

== Members ==
HCG 3 consists of 4 member galaxies. Their details are written below.

| HCG | Galaxy | Type | Ra | Dec | Diameter (") | Estimated Distance (Megaparsec) | Velocity (km/s) | B-R | B_T |
|---|---|---|---|---|---|---|---|---|---|
| 3A | MCG -01-02-032 | Sc | 00^{h} 34^{m} 13.1990^{s} | −07° 33′ 53.554″ | 67.50 | 102.75 | 7302 | 1.4100 | 15.36 |
| 3B | PGC 2064 | SB0a | 00^{h} 34^{m} 25.1139^{s} | −07° 35′ 58.212″ | 56.70 | 110.98 | 7860 | 1.7100 | 15.64 |
| 3C | PGC 2059 | Sd? | 00^{h} 34^{m} 20.0199^{s} | −07° 36′ 00.926″ | 25.40 | 165.33 | 11545 | 1.3700 | 16.54 |
| 3D | PGC 2043 | S0 | 00^{h} 34^{m} 09.8359^{s} | −07° 36′ 08.595″ | 44.40 | 110.15 | 7804 | 1.6900 | 15.91 |
