= NGC 6975 =

Galaxy in the constellation Aquarius

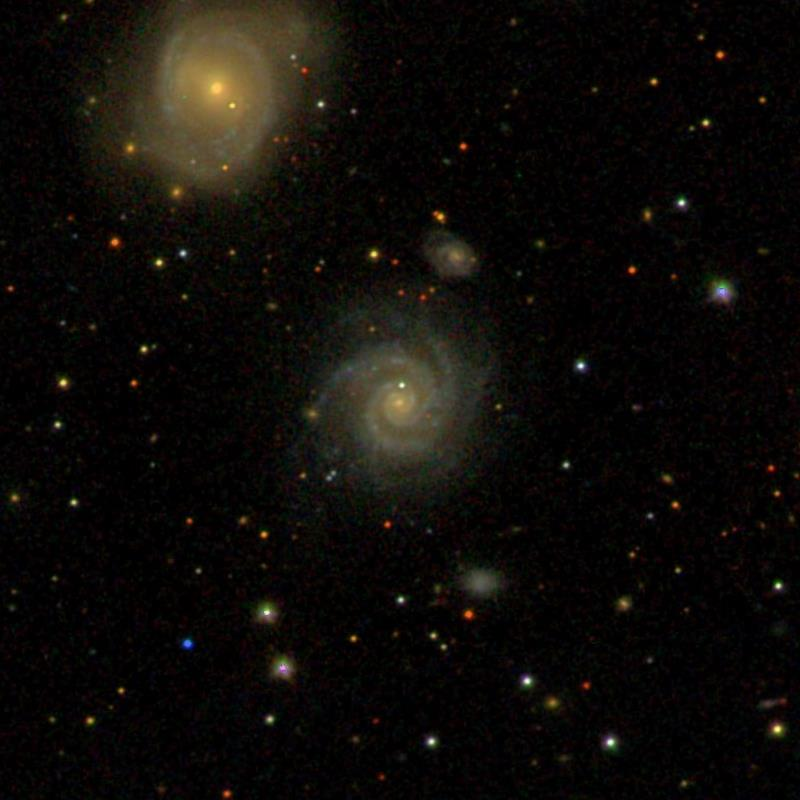
- NGC 6975 (SDSS DR14)

Observation data (J2000 epoch)
- Constellation: Aquarius
- Right ascension: 20^{h} 52^{m} 26.023^{s}
- Declination: −05° 46′ 19.84″
- Redshift: 5956 km/s
- Heliocentric radial velocity: 0.019868
- Apparent magnitude (B): 14.95

Characteristics
- Type: SAB(r)bc?
- Apparent size (V): 0.98′ × 0.84′

Other designations
- HCG 88c, NGC 6975, MCG -01-53-015, PGC 65620

NGC 6975, also known as NGC 6976, is a spiral galaxy in the constellation Aquarius. The object was discovered on 12 July 1864 by the German astronomer Albert Marth.

NGC 6975 is part of Hickson Compact Group 88, along with NGC 6977, NGC 6978, and MCG-01-53-014. The group is at a distance of about 273 million light years (84 million parsecs).

== Supernova ==
One supernova has been observed in NGC 6975: SN 2012ga (Type II, mag. 17.8) was discovered by The CHilean Automatic Supernova sEarch (CHASE) on 22 April 2012.

== See also ==
- List of NGC objects
