= HCG 87 =

Galaxy cluster in the constellation Capricornus

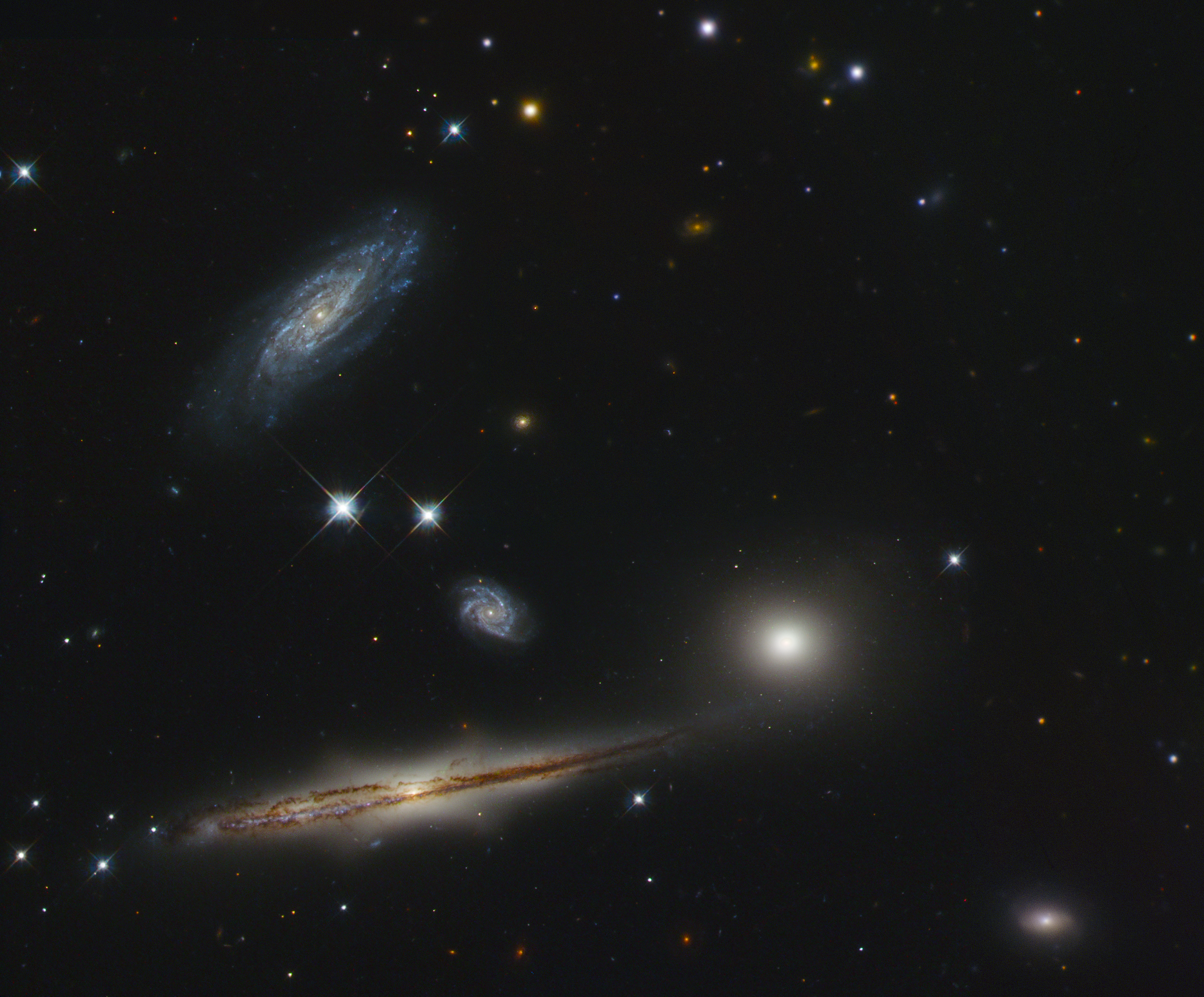
- Galaxy Group HCG 87

Observation data (Epoch )
- Constellation: Capricornus
- Right ascension: 20^{h} 48^{m} 11.9s^{s}
- Declination: −19° 50′ 35″
- Number of galaxies: ~5
- Redshift: 8,874 km/s
- Distance: 400 million

HCG 87 is a compact group of galaxies listed in the Hickson Compact Group Catalogue. This group is about 400 million light-years away in the constellation Capricornus. The group distinguishes itself as one of the most compact groups of galaxies, hosting two active galactic nuclei and a starburst among its three members, all of which show signs of interaction. This interaction, which astronomers have called visually, and scientifically, intriguing is being examined to understand the influence of active nuclei on star formation histories.

== Members ==
Members of the HCG 87
Name	Type	R.A. (J2000)	Dec. (J2000)	Redshift (km/s)	Apparent Magnitude
HCG 87a	S0 pec	20^{h} 48^{m} 15.0^{s}	−19° 50′ 58″	8443 ± 14	15.3
HCG 87b	SA(r)0 pec	20^{h} 48^{m} 10.9^{s}	−19° 51′ 23″	8740 ± 20	15.4
HCG 87c	Sb	20^{h} 48^{m} 12.0^{s}	−19° 49′ 56″	8914 ± 7	16.1
HCG 87d	Sd	20^{h} 48^{m} 12.8^{s}	−19° 50′ 46″	10200 ± 160	17.8
