= NGC 7214 =

Galaxy in the constellation Piscis Austrinus

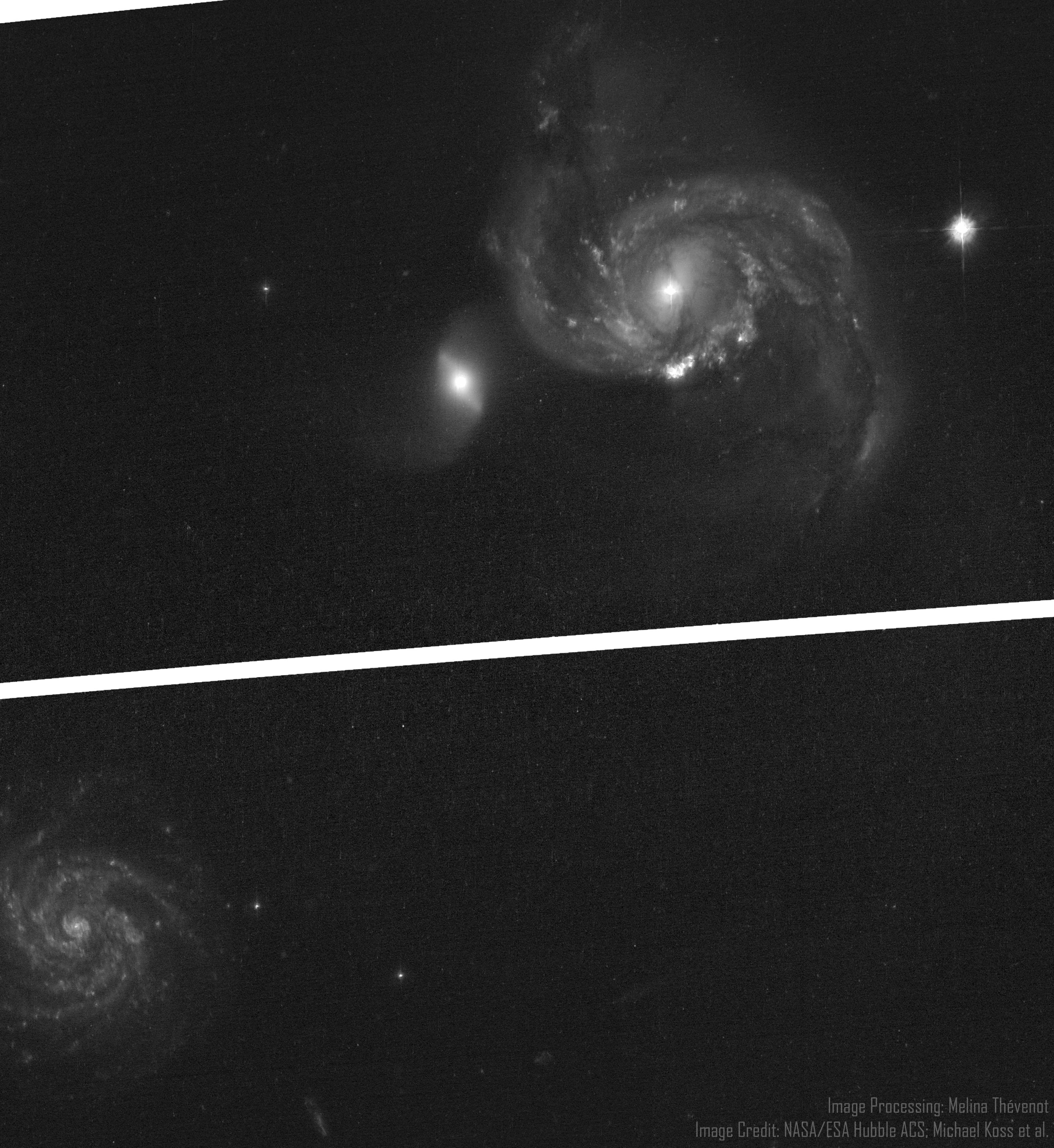
- HST image of NGC 7214

Observation data (J2000 epoch)
- Constellation: Piscis Austrinus
- Right ascension: 22^{h} 09^{m} 07.66^{s}
- Declination: −27° 48′ 34.08″
- Redshift: 0.023853
- Heliocentric radial velocity: 7151 ± 4 km/s
- Distance: 346.4 ± 24.3 Mly (106.22 ± 7.44 Mpc)
- Group or cluster: Hickson 91
- Apparent magnitude (V): 12.5

Characteristics
- Type: SB(s)bc pec: Sy1.2
- Size: ~461,000 ly (141.2 kpc) (estimated)

Other designations
- 2dFGRS S175Z138, 2MASX J22090769-2748340, 6dF J2209076-274834, ESO 467-G012, HCG 091A, IRAS 22062-2803, PGC 68152, LEDA 3222105, RBS 1824

NGC 7214 is a large barred spiral galaxy located in the southern constellation of Piscis Austrinus. The redshift of the galaxy is (z) 0.023 and it was first discovered by the British astronomer John Herschel in July 1834, who described the object as a possible globular cluster with an irregular center. It is the brightest and largest member of the four galaxies in the Hickson 91 galaxy group known as the NGC 7214 group. This galaxy is also classified as an active Seyfert galaxy of type 1 or type 1.2.

== Description ==
NGC 7214 is categorized as a late-type face-on spiral galaxy of type SBc. The rotation curve for this galaxy is described as both irregular and asymmetric. The central nucleus has a bright appearance, with spiral arms that are also bright on the inner side and much fainter outer spiral arms that are extended. The nuclear emission region has a compact appearance with a weak H II region that is located in the east.

NGC 7214 is undergoing an interaction with a smaller spiral galaxy companion (HCG 91c), given the presence of a large prominent tidal tail extending from it. The tail structure has two components that point towards the northeast. The tail also contains star forming regions, given the traces of Hydrogen-alpha knots. One of the spiral arms on the southern side is shown to have constant velocity likely caused through streaming motions by the interactions. The central nucleus is surrounded by several H II regions having either moderate or weak signs of star formation.

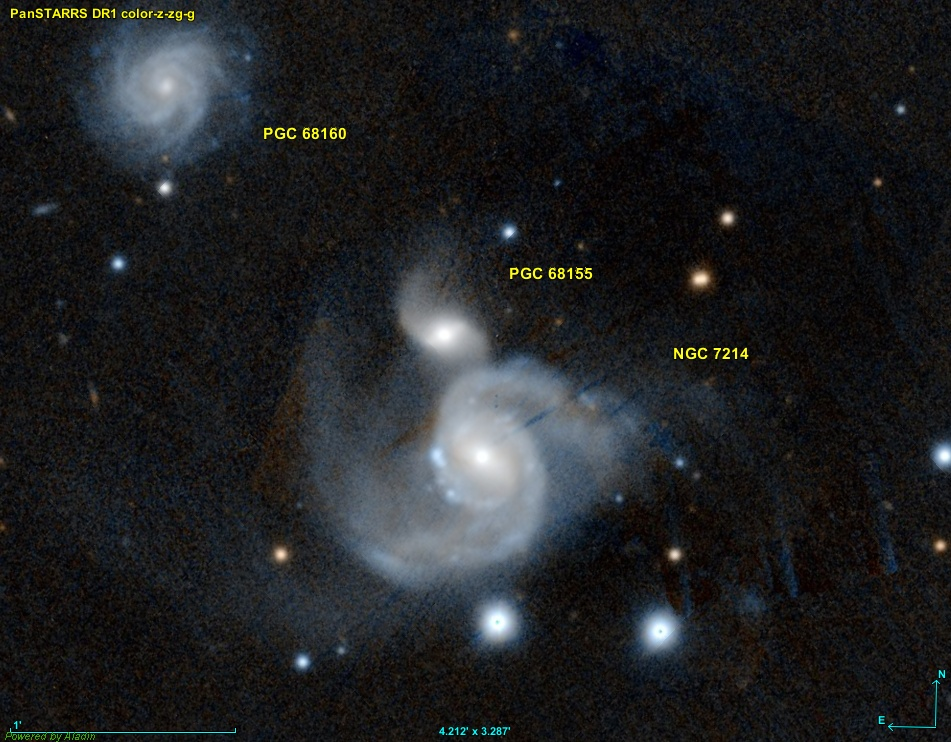
NGC 7214 taken with Pan-STARRS.
