= NGC 3697 =

Spiral galaxy in the constellation Leo

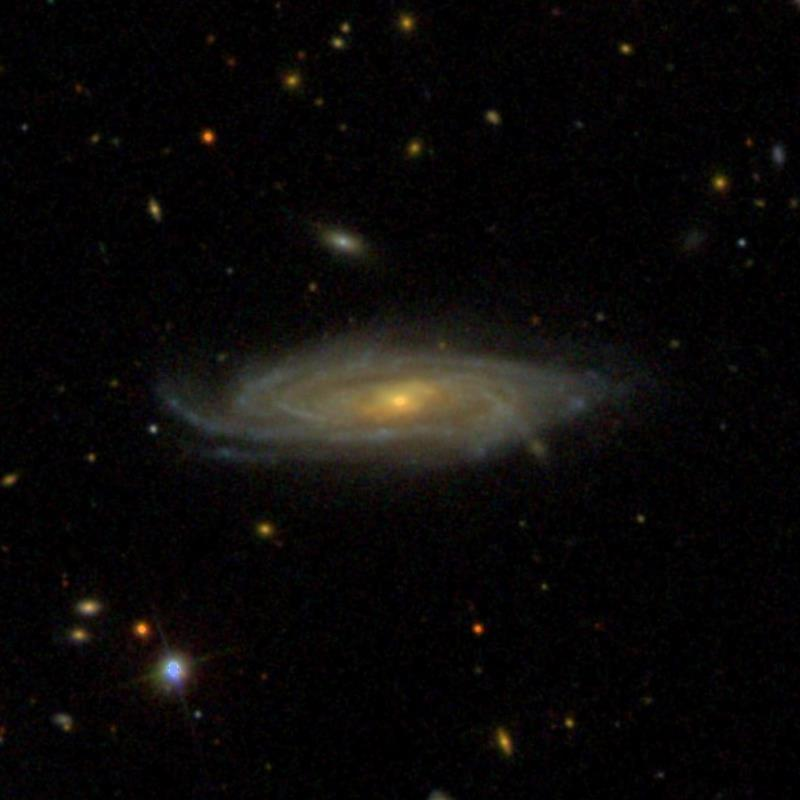
- NGC 3697 by SDSS

Observation data (J2000 epoch)
- Constellation: Leo
- Right ascension: 11^{h} 28^{m} 50.380^{s}
- Declination: +20° 47′ 42.61″
- Redshift: 0.020884
- Heliocentric radial velocity: 6261 km/s
- Distance: 291.57 ± 24.07 Mly (89.395 ± 7.379 Mpc)
- Group or cluster: HCG 53
- Apparent magnitude (V): 12.62
- Apparent magnitude (B): 14.1

Characteristics
- Type: SABb
- Size: 212,000 ly (65,010 pc) (Note: POSS1 103a-O values used.)
- Apparent size (V): 2.5′ × 0.7′

Other designations
- UGC 6479, MGC+04-27-042, PGC 35347

NGC 3697 is a spiral galaxy in the constellation of Leo. It was discovered on 24 February 1827 by John Herschel. It was described as "extremely faint, very small, extended 90°" by John Louis Emil Dreyer, the compiler of the New General Catalogue. It is a member of HCG 53, a compact group of galaxies.

== Supernova ==
One supernova has been observed in NGC 3697:

- SN 2020aavb (Type Ia, mag. 17), was discovered by the Italian Supernovae Search Project (ISSP) on 23 November 2020.
