= UGC 2140 =

Irregular galaxy in the constellation Aries

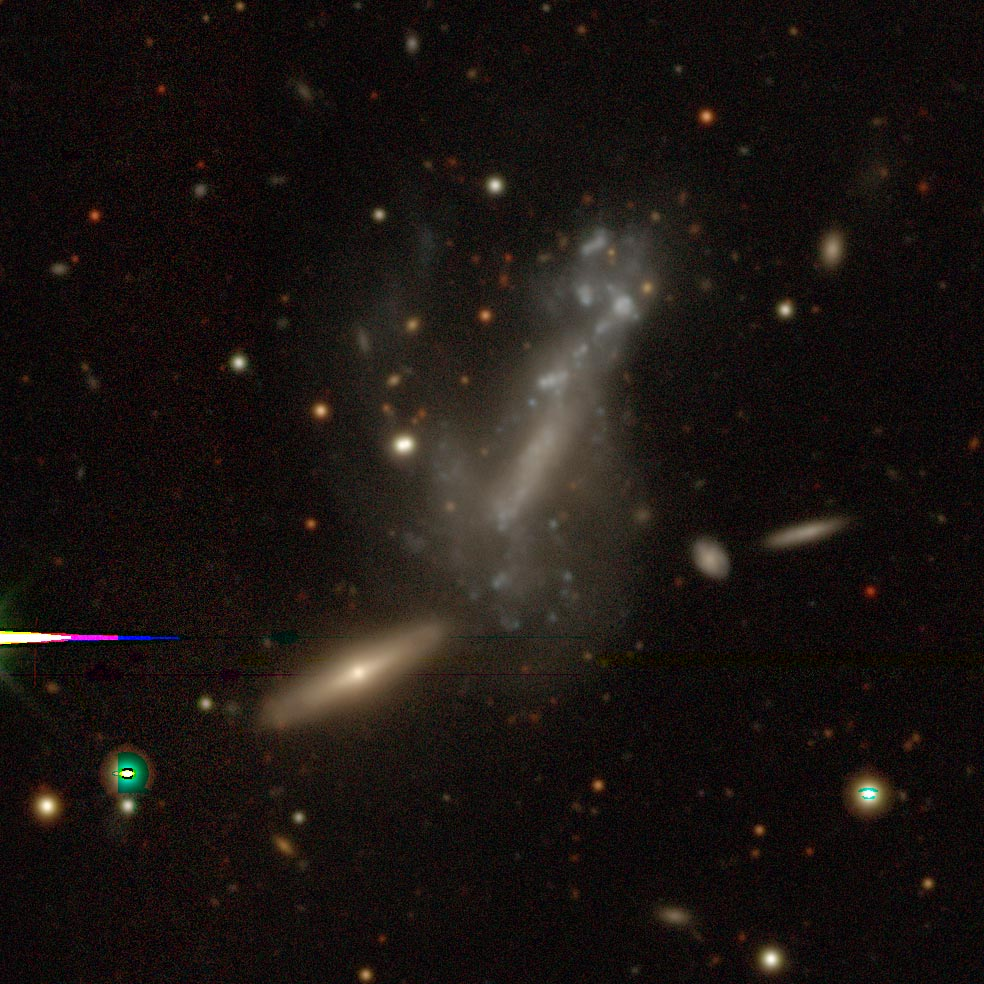
- UGC 2140 with the legacy surveys

Observation data (J2000 epoch)
- Constellation: Aries
- Right ascension: 02^{h} 39^{m} 06.1^{s}
- Declination: +18° 23′ 02″
- Redshift: 0.013583
- Apparent magnitude (V): 15.43

Characteristics
- Type: Irr
- Apparent size (V): 1.7′

Other designations
- VV 143, HCG 18, UGC 2140, Z 462-37, APG 258, MCG+03-07-037, Z 0236.3+1810, Arp 258

UGC 2140 is an irregular galaxy in the constellation Aries. It was thought to be a compact group of galaxies, catalogued as HCG 18, but in 1999 the object was found to be a single galaxy with multiple star-forming regions.
