= NGC 542 =

Galaxy in the constellation Andromeda

NGC 536
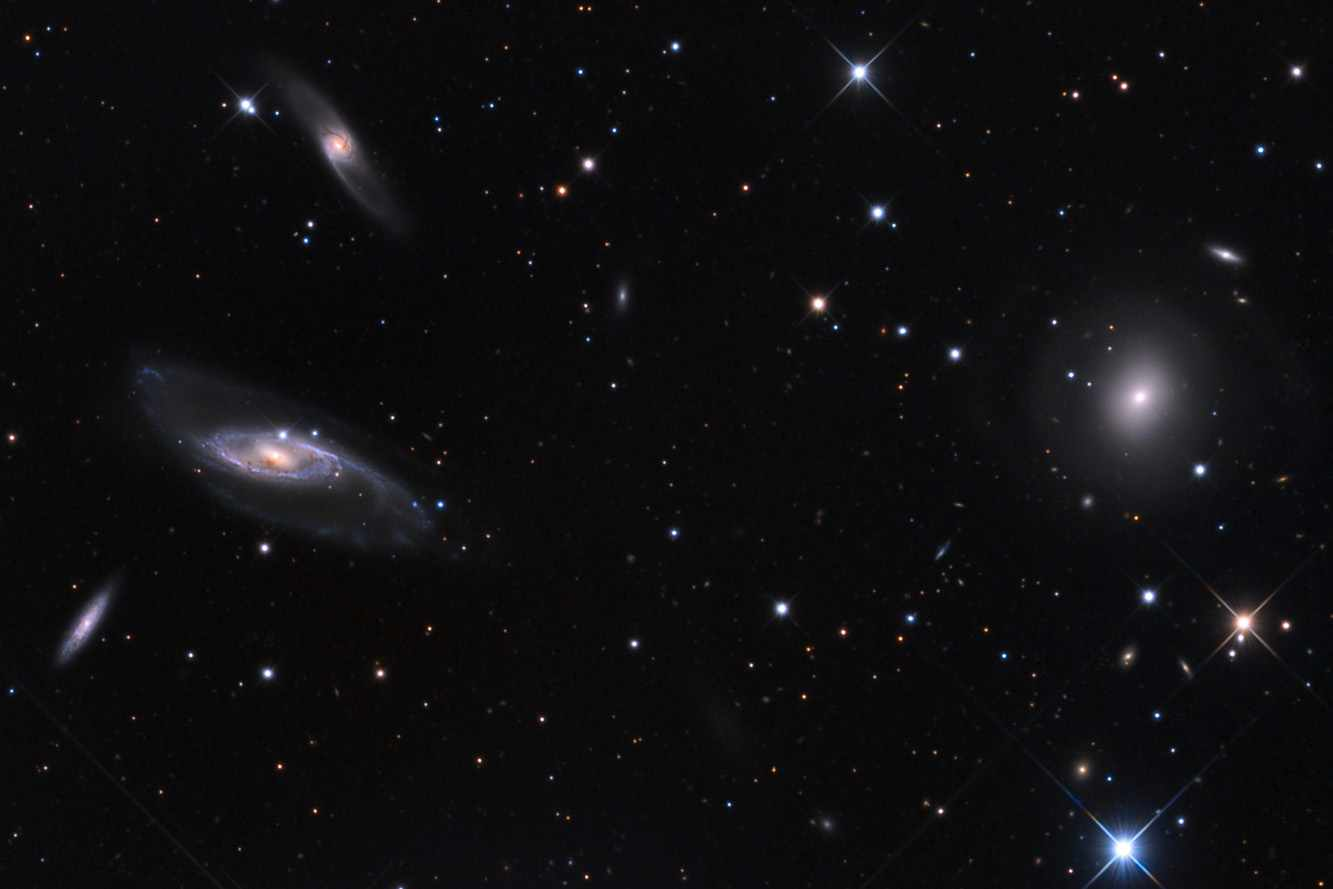
- NGC 542 (left) in HCG 10

Observation data (J2000 epoch)
- Constellation: Andromeda
- Right ascension: 01^{h} 26^{m} 30.825^{s}
- Declination: +34° 40′ 31.72″
- Redshift: 0.015531
- Heliocentric radial velocity: 4862 km/s
- Apparent magnitude (B): 15.4

Characteristics
- Type: Scd

Other designations
- MCG +06-04-022, PGC 5360

NGC 542 is a spiral galaxy in the constellation Andromeda, which is approximately 215 million light years from the Milky Way. Together with the galaxies NGC 529, NGC 531, and NGC 536, it forms the Hickson Compact Group 10, abbreviated HCG 10. It was discovered by Irish astronomer R.J. Mitchell in 1885.

== See also ==
- List of NGC objects (1–1000)
