= NGC 5910 =

Galaxy in the constellation of Serpens

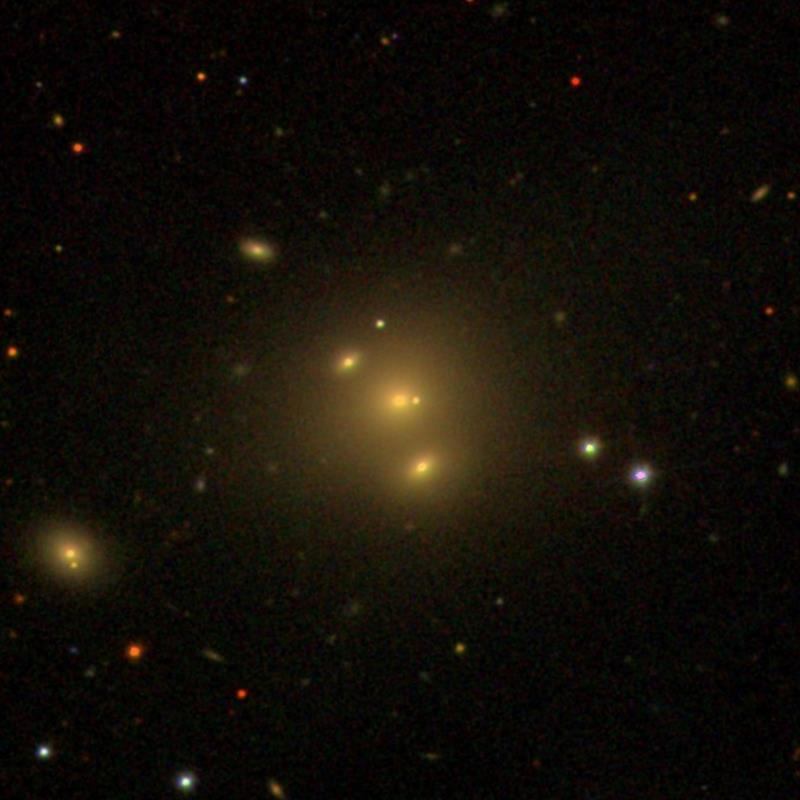
- SDSS image of NGC 5910.

Observation data (J2000 epoch)
- Constellation: Serpens
- Right ascension: 15^{h} 19^{m} 24.7^{s}
- Declination: +20° 53′ 47″
- Redshift: 0.040426
- Heliocentric radial velocity: 12119 km/s
- Distance: 540 Mly (167 Mpc)
- Group or cluster: HCG 74
- Apparent magnitude (V): 14.96

Characteristics
- Type: E1
- Size: ~218,700 ly (67.06 kpc) (estimated)
- Apparent size (V): 0.82 x 0.77

Other designations
- PGC 054689, HCG 074A, VV 139a, CGCG 135-045, MCG +04-36-035

NGC 5910 is an elliptical galaxy located about 540 million light-years away in the constellation Serpens. It was discovered by astronomer William Hershel on April 13, 1785. NGC 5910 is also a strong radio source with a conspicuous nuclear jet.

== Physical characteristics ==
NGC 5910 appears to have a double nucleus, with a faint nuclear dust lane also being observed.

A pair of asymmetries in the isotopotal profile of NGC 5910 with one of them being brighter than the other, weaker asymmetry suggests a past merger and collision of one or more galaxies.

=== Group membership ===
NGC 5910 is the brightest and dominant member of a compact group of galaxies known as Hickson Compact Group 74. The group consists of 5 members in total, with a velocity dispersion of 537 km/s and a diameter of 260,000 ly (80 kpc). The other members are 2MASX J15193179+2053005, PGC 54692, PGC 54694, and MCG+04-36-036. The other galaxies appear to be embedded within a common envelope that belongs to NGC 5910.

NGC 5910 appears to lie near the Hercules Superclusters.

== Supernovae ==
Two supernovae have been discovered in NGC 5910: SN 2002ec, and PSN J15192497+2054024.

=== SN 2002ec ===
SN 2002ec was discovered in NGC 5910 in July 2002 via unfiltered KAIT CCD images by Li and Beutler. It was located 8.5" east and 12.9" south of the nucleus and was classified as Type la.

=== PSN J15192497+2054024 ===
PSN J15192497+2054024 was discovered in NGC 5910 on 17 March 2013 by the Catalina Real-Time Transient Survey and Stan Howerton. It was located 2" west and 20" north of the center of NGC 5910 and classified as a type Ia.

== See also ==
- List of NGC objects (5001–6000)
- NGC 6166
