= NGC 1741 =

Distant pair of interacting galaxies in the constellation Eridanus

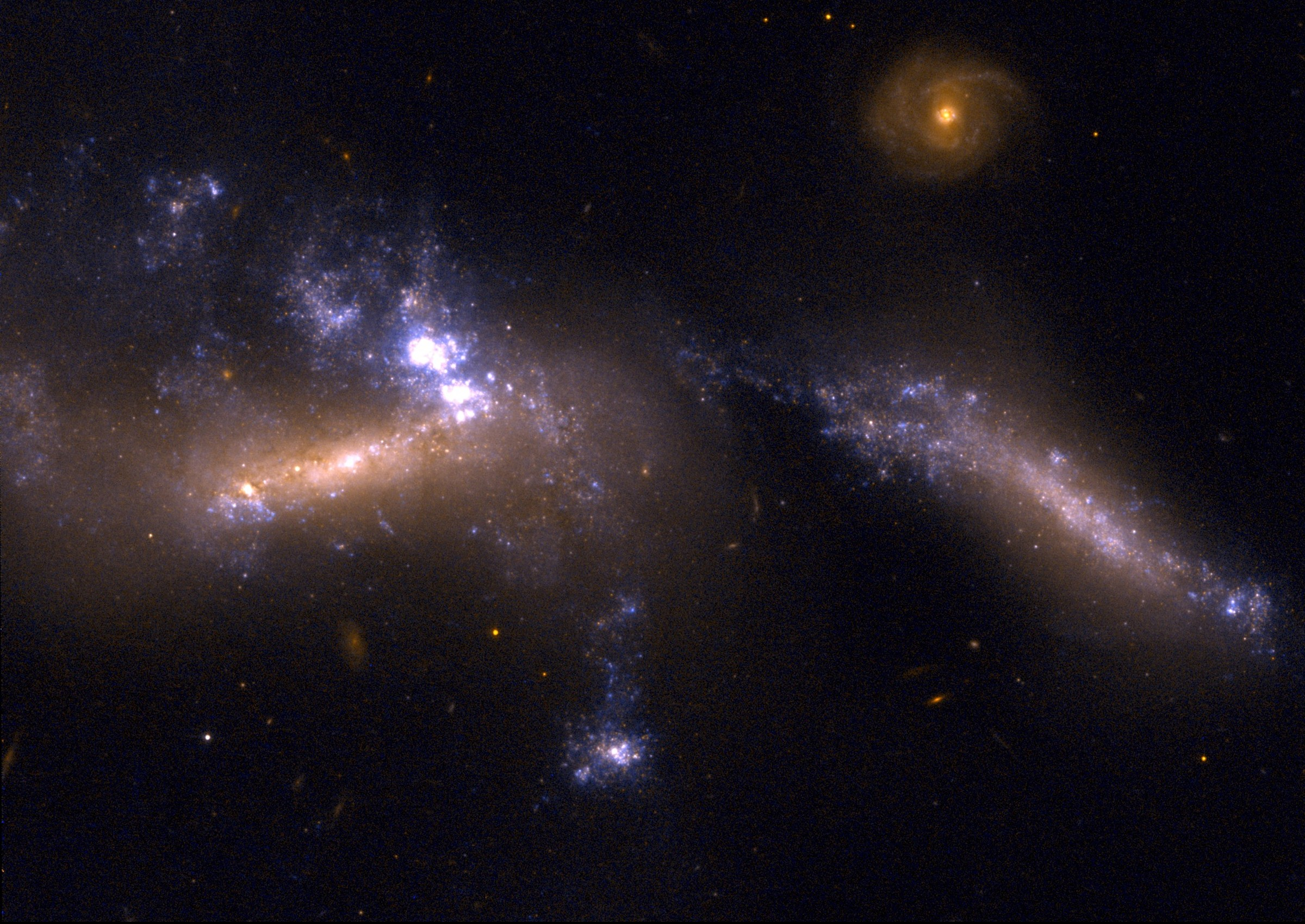
- The pair: NGC 1741A (left) and NGC 1741B (right) as taken by the Hubble Space Telescope

Observation data (J2000 epoch)
- Constellation: Eridanus
- Right ascension: 05^{h} 01^{m} 38.3^{s}
- Declination: −04° 15′ 25.2″
- Redshift: 0.013473 ± 0.000018
- Heliocentric radial velocity: 4 039 ± 5 km/s
- Distance: 56.4 ± 3.9 Mpc (184 ± 13 Mly)h^{−1}_{0.73}
- Apparent magnitude (V): 14.4 / 14.6
- Apparent magnitude (B): 15.0 / 15.2

Characteristics
- Type: Im D
- Apparent size (V): 1.0' × 0.3' / 0.4' × 0.15'

Other designations
- HCG 31A / 31B; PGC 16574 / 16570; MK 1089; IRAS04591-0419; MGC -1-13-45; ARP 259

NGC 1741 is a distant pair of interacting galaxies (NGC 1741A and NGC 1741B) in the constellation Eridanus. It was discovered on 6 January 1878 by French astronomer Édouard Stephan. As a result of the collision, the galaxies are in a rapid starburst phase. The galaxies are classed as Wolf–Rayet galaxies due to their high content of rare Wolf–Rayet stars.

This pair of spiral galaxies is made up of PGC 16570 (NGC 1741B) and PGC 16574 (NGC 1741A). This pair is part of the Halton Arp catalog as Arp 259 and the Hickson Compact Group as HCG 31A (NGC 1741A) and HCG 31B (NGC 1741B).
