= HCG 1 =

Compact group of galaxies

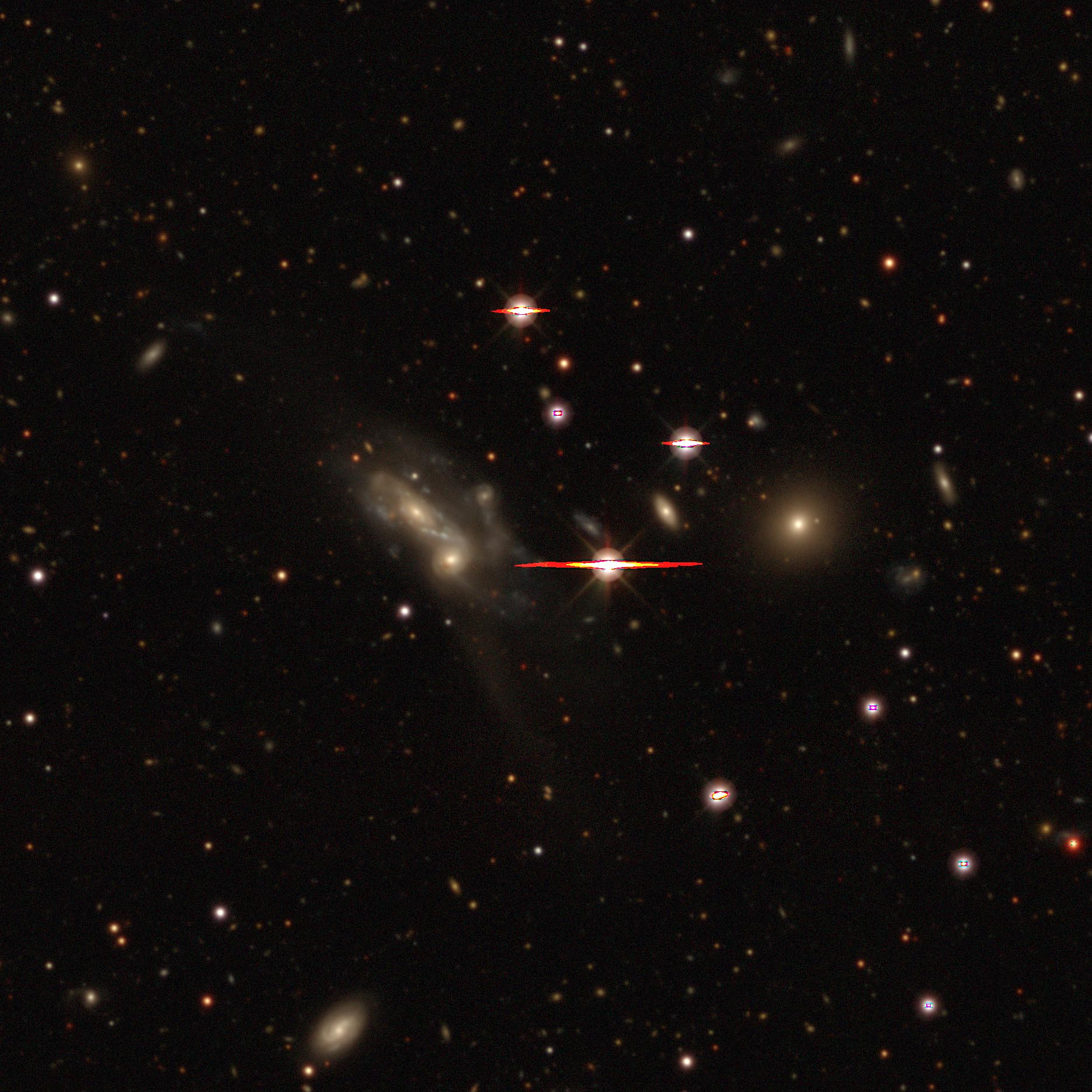
- Hickson Compact Group 1 with Legacy Surveys DR10

Observation data (J2000 epoch)
- Constellation: Andromeda
- Right ascension: 00^{h} 23^{m} 01.365^{s}
- Declination: +25° 26′ 47.793″
- Redshift: 0.03397
- Distance: 460 Million light-years

Characteristics
- Size: 2'.9 x 2'.9

Other designations
- V1CG 660

HCG 1 is a compact group of galaxies in the Hickson Compact Group catalogue identified using a systematic search by the Palomar Observatory Sky Survey led by Paul Hickson in 1982. This group is composed of four interacting member galaxies, two of which are peculiar.

== Properties ==
A study proves that HCG 1A is the brightest in this group, having an absolute magnitude of 20.6, corrected total blue magnitude ($B_{TC}$) of 14.43 and blue minus red (B-R) 1.29, indicating this galaxy is undergoing vigorous star birth and formation. HCG 1B, 1C and 1D have absolute magnitudes of 20.0, 19.5 and 18.5, suggesting that HCG 1D is in a high chance of being dominated by old, cool and ageing stars. Hickson Compact Group 1 has a crossing time (H_{0}t_{c}) of 0.0479 and a radial velocity dispersion (km/s) of 85.1. This proves that HCG 1 is a stable and moderate evolving group and this group has an environment that is conducive to have frequent gravitational interactions, which affect galaxies morphological shape and may increase star formation in certain interaction areas.

A study shows that HCG 1 have a total of 13 foreground stars, 9 foreground unidentified objects and 10 foreground galaxies. Hickson Compact Group 1 has a total of 2 out of 4 galaxies that are spirals, the spiral fraction is exactly 50% or 0.5.

Another study shows that HCG 1A and 1B has a tidal arm, indicating that they are gravitationally interacting within themselves or with other galaxies.

== Members ==
Hickson Compact Group 1 have 4 members. Their details and information are stated in the table below.

Members of HCG 1
HGC	Name	Type	Mag.	Right Ascension	Declination	Distance	Major Axis Diameter	Minor Axis Diameter	B_TC	B−R	Redshift	Velocity (km/s)
1a	PGC 1627	Sbc? peculiar	15.0	00 26 07.1	+25 43 31	460 Mly	37.60	26.90	14.43	1.29	0.034147	10237
1b	PGC 1625	S0/a? peculiar	15.5	00 26 06.0	+25 43 09	460 Mly	42.80	10.70	15.04	1.36	0.034227	10266
1c	PGC 1614	E1	15.9	00 25 54.4	+25 43 25	450 Mly	10.70	10.70	15.57	1.69	0.033543	10056
1d	PGC 1618	S0	17.4	00 25 58.8	+25 43 31	455 Mly	8.50	4.80	16.50	1.60	0.033757	10120
