= NGC 5353 =

Galaxy in the constellation Canes Venatici

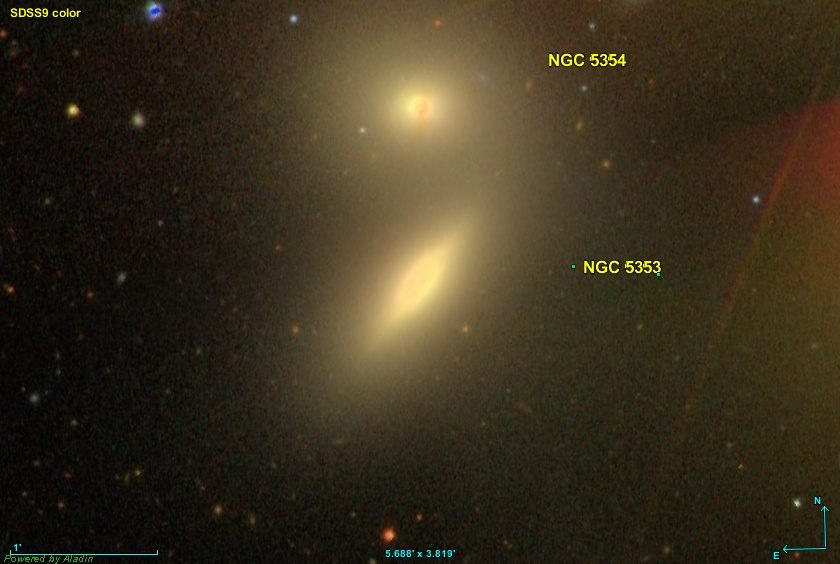
- NGC 5353 (center) with NGC 5354 (above) imaged by SDSS

Observation data (J2000 epoch)
- Constellation: Canes Venatici
- Right ascension: 13^{h} 53^{m} 26.6971^{s}
- Declination: +40° 16′ 58.984″
- Redshift: 0.007755±0.0000100
- Heliocentric radial velocity: 2,325±3 km/s
- Distance: 88.48 ± 7.74 Mly (27.129 ± 2.372 Mpc)
- Group or cluster: HCG 68
- Apparent magnitude (V): +11.96

Characteristics
- Type: S0 edge-on
- Size: ~99,200 ly (30.41 kpc) (estimated)
- Apparent size (V): 2.2′ × 1.1′

Other designations
- HOLM 555B, IRAS F13513+4031, 2MASX J13532674+4016592, UGC 8813, MCG +07-29-010, PGC 49356, CGCG 219-018

NGC 5353 is a lenticular galaxy in the constellation of Canes Venatici. Its velocity with respect to the cosmic microwave background is 2,510±13 km/s, which corresponds to a Hubble distance of 120.7 ± 8.5 Mly (37.02 ± 2.60 Mpc). However, seven non-redshift measurements give a closer mean distance of 88.48 ± 7.74 Mly (27.129 ± 2.372 Mpc). It was discovered by German-British astronomer William Herschel on 14 January 1788.

NGC 5353 is a radio galaxy, i.e. it has giant regions of radio emission extending well beyond its visible structure. It also has an active galactic nucleus, i.e. it has a compact region at the center of a galaxy that emits a significant amount of energy across the electromagnetic spectrum, with characteristics indicating that this luminosity is not produced by the stars.

== Hickson Compact Group 68 ==
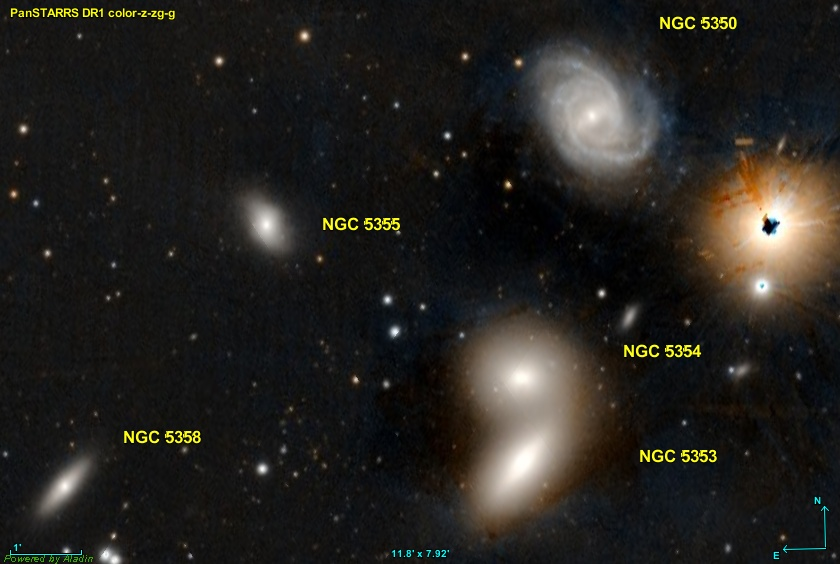
Hickson Compact Group 68 imaged by Pan-STARRS

NGC 5353 belongs to the Hickson Compact Group 68, which consists of one spiral galaxy, and four lenticular galaxies. The other galaxies in the group are NGC 5354, NGC 5350, NGC 5355, and NGC 5358. The distances of the galaxies in this group range from 121 to 133 million light-years.

== Supernova ==
One supernova has been observed in NGC 5353:

- SN 2019ein (Type Ia, mag. 18.194) was discovered by ATLAS on 1 May 2019.

== See also ==
- List of NGC objects (5001–6000)
