= NGC 1100 =

Galaxy in the constellation Eridanus

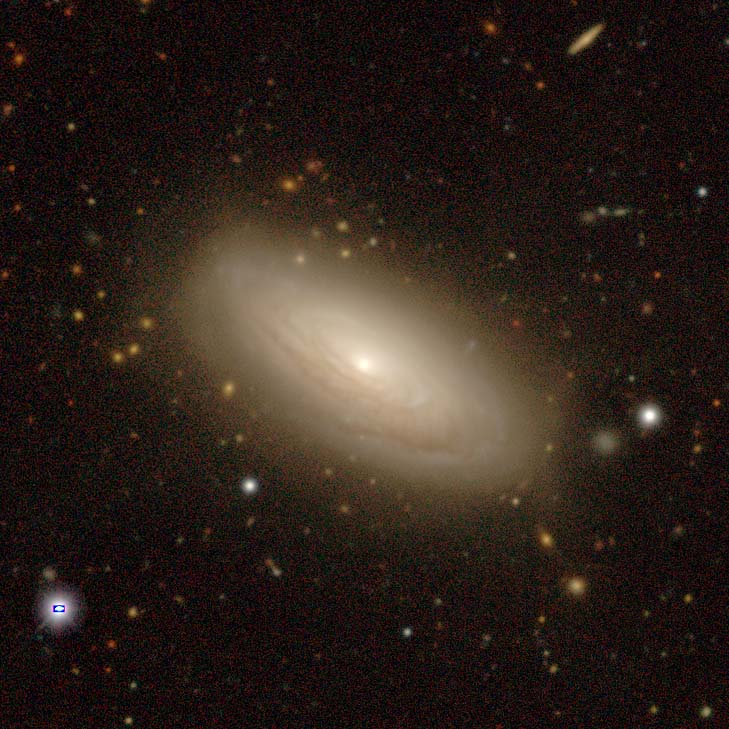
- NGC 1100 imaged by Legacy Surveys

Observation data (J2000 epoch)
- Constellation: Eridanus
- Right ascension: 02^{h} 45^{m} 35.80^{s}
- Declination: −17° 41′ 20.00″
- Redshift: 0.025147±0.000083
- Distance: 235 Mly (71.12 Mpc)
- Apparent magnitude (V): 13.1

Characteristics
- Type: SAB(r)a
- Size: 176,900 ly
- Apparent size (V): 1.66' x 0.741'
- Notable features: Maybe an unbarred spiral (?)

Other designations
- PGC 10438, 2MASX J02453607-1741201, MCG-03-08-016, ESO 546-18, GSC 05866-00577, ESO-LV 546-0180, NVSS J024536-174124, HCG 21B, 6dFGS gJ024536.1-174120, SGC 024316-1753.8, LEDA 10438, APMBGC 546+061-119, [SLK2004] 338

NGC 1100 is a spiral galaxy located around 235 million light-years away in the constellation Eridanus. NGC 1100 is situated close to the celestial equator, and it was discovered on October 17, 1885, by Francis Preserved Leavenworth. NGC 1100 is not known to have much star formation, and is not known to have an active galactic nucleus.

== Supernova ==
One supernova has been observed in NGC 1100:

- SN 2024vcj (Type Ia-91bg-like, mag. 19.3561) was discovered by the Zwicky Transient Facility on 9 September 2024.

== See also ==
- List of NGC objects (1001–2000)
