= NGC 3735 =

Galaxy in the constellation Draco

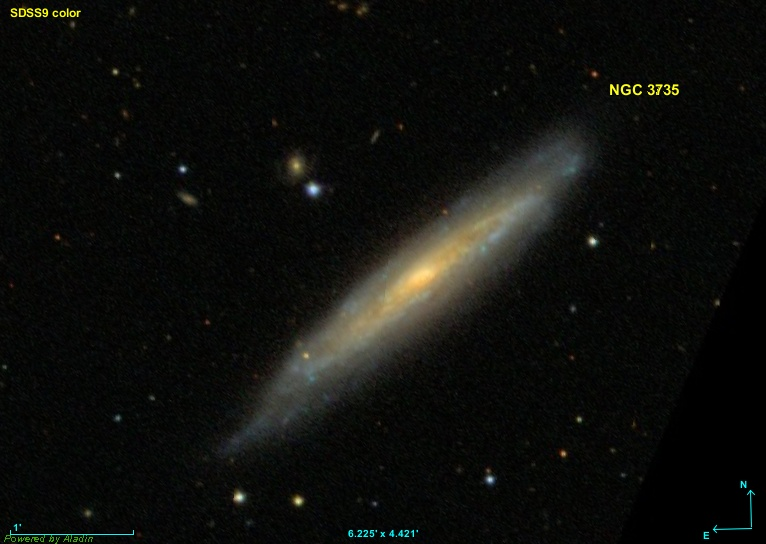
- NGC 3735 imaged by SDSS

Observation data (J2000 epoch)
- Constellation: Draco
- Right ascension: 11^{h} 35^{m} 57.2586^{s}
- Declination: +70° 32′ 07.774″
- Redshift: 0.008993±0.00000700
- Heliocentric radial velocity: 2,696±2 km/s
- Distance: 123.87 ± 3.81 Mly (37.979 ± 1.167 Mpc)
- Group or cluster: NGC 3735 group (LGG 240)
- Apparent magnitude (V): 12.50

Characteristics
- Type: SAc? edge-on
- Size: ~154,900 ly (47.50 kpc) (estimated)
- Apparent size (V): 4.2′ × 0.8′

Other designations
- IRAS 11330+7048, 2MASX J11355732+7032081, UGC 6567, MCG +12-11-036, PGC 35869, CGCG 334-042

NGC 3735 is a spiral galaxy in the constellation of Draco. Its velocity with respect to the cosmic microwave background is 2,776±6 km/s, which corresponds to a Hubble distance of 133.5 ± 9.4 Mly (40.94 ± 2.87 Mpc). Additionally, 19 non-redshift measurements give a closer mean distance of 123.87 ± 3.81 Mly (37.979 ± 1.167 Mpc). It was discovered by German-British astronomer William Herschel on 7 December 1801.

NGC 3735 is a Seyfert II galaxy, i.e. it has a quasar-like nucleus with very high surface brightnesses whose spectra reveal strong, high-ionisation emission lines, but unlike quasars, the host galaxy is clearly detectable.

== Supermassive black hole ==
Based on measurements of the near-infrared K-band luminosity of the galaxy's bulge, NGC 3735 has a supermassive black hole with a mass of 1×10^{7.6}M_{☉} (40 million solar masses).

== Nuclear maser source ==
A survey conducted in 1996 and 1997 for H_{2}O maser emission in the active galactic nuclei of 29 galaxies found one new maser in NGC 3735.

== NGC 3735 group ==
NGC 3735 is a member the NGC 3735 group (also known as LGG 240), which contains three galaxies, including UGC 6552 and UGC 6711.

== Supernova ==
One supernova has been observed in NGC 3735:

- SN 1998cn (Type Ia, mag. 15.8) was discovered by Michael Schwartz on 17 June 1998.

== See also ==
- List of NGC objects (3001–4000)
