= NGC 3817 =

Galaxy in the Virgo constellation

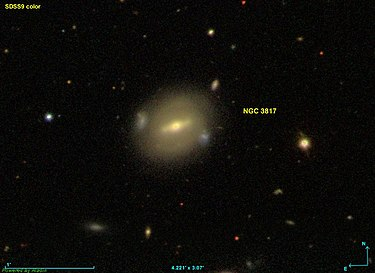
- Hubble Space Telescope image of NGC 3817

Observation data (J2000 epoch)
- Constellation: Virgo
- Right ascension: 11h 41m 52.9487s
- Declination: +10° 18′ 15.7838″
- Redshift: 0.02026
- Heliocentric radial velocity: 6210 ± 3 km/s
- Distance: 91.7 ± 3.1 Mly (28.1 ± 1.0 Mpc)
- Apparent magnitude (V): 14.4

Characteristics
- Type: SB (R) c
- Apparent size (V): 0.677′ × 0.669′
- Notable features: LINER-type Active Galaxy Nucleus

Other designations
- GSC 04937-00483, LEDA 36304, UGCA 243 |SIMBAD=http://simbad.u-strasbg.fr/simbad/sim-id?Ident=NGC3817|NASA/IPAC=http://nedwww.ipac.caltech.edu/cgi-bin/nph-objsearch?objname=NGC3817

NGC 3817 is a barred spiral galaxy located approximately 91.7 million light-years away in the constellation Virgo. It was discovered by the German-British astronomer William Herschel on March 15, 1784, using his telescope in Slough, England. Classified as a LINER-type Active Galactic Nucleus (AGN), NGC 3817 exhibits low-ionization nuclear emission lines from its core. With an apparent magnitude of 14.4, the galaxy features a faint ring structure and loosely wound spiral arms.
