= NGC 190 =

Pair of interacting galaxies in the constellation Pisces

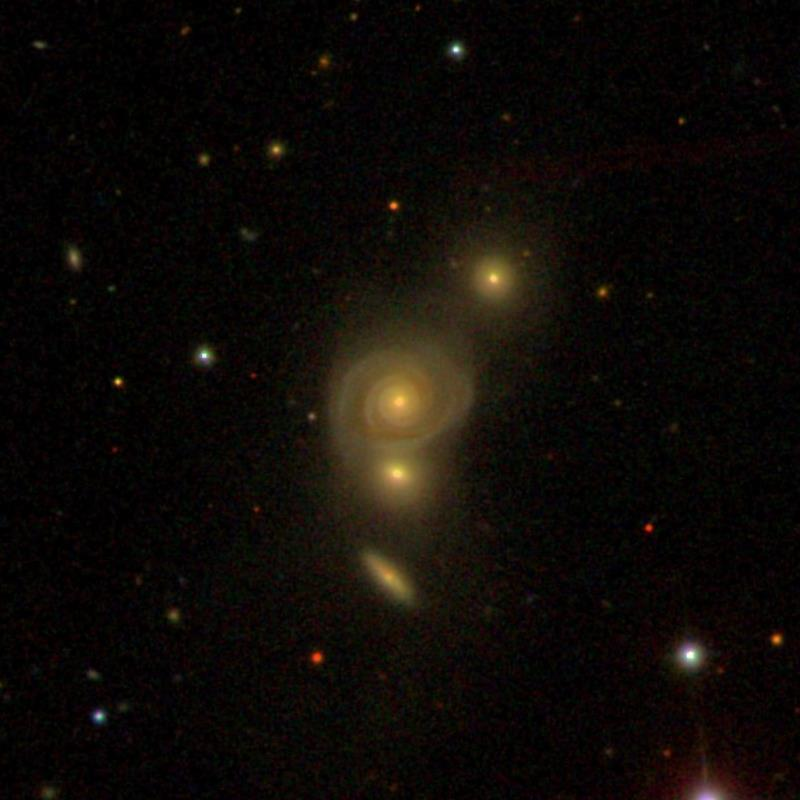
- SDSS image of NGC 190 (above) and NGC 190A (below)

Observation data (J2000 epoch)
- Constellation: Pisces
- Right ascension: 00^{h} 38^{m} 54.7^{s}
- Declination: +07° 03′ 35″
- Redshift: 0.037342

Characteristics
- Type: Sab

Other designations
- UGC 397.

NGC 190 is a pair of interacting galaxies located in the constellation Pisces. This pair was formed due to the collision of the two galaxies around 30 million years ago. It was discovered in 1894.

NGC 190 is part of HCG 5 (Hickson Compact Group 5) along with NGC 190 NED02, MCG +01-02-042 and PGC 2326.
