= NGC 531 =

Galaxy in the constellation Andromeda

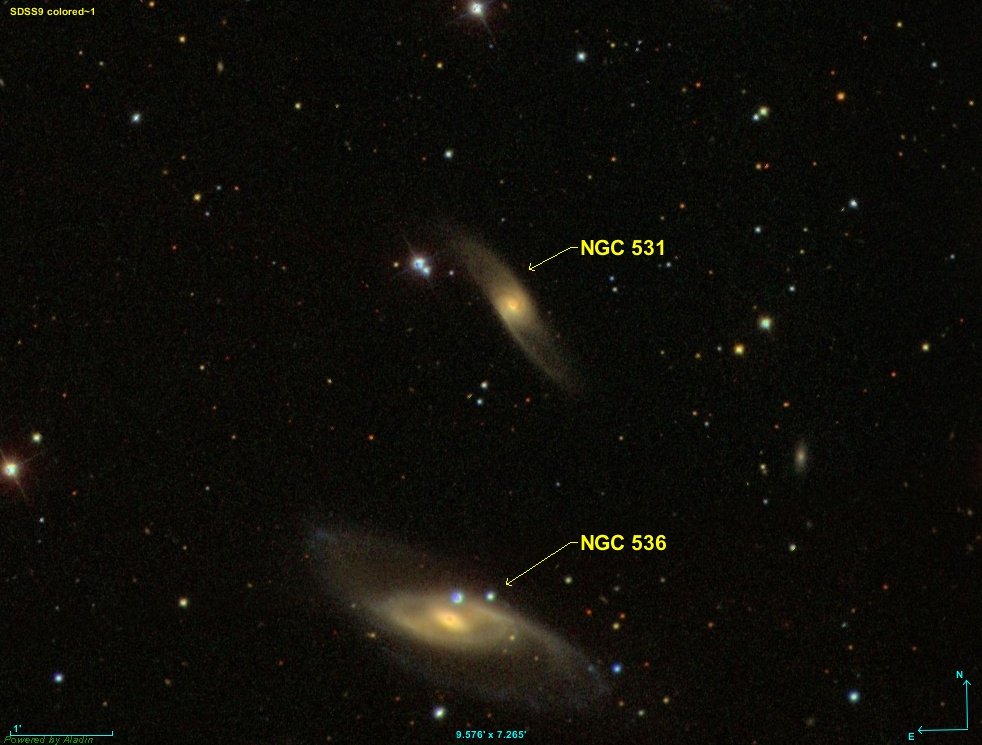
- SDSS image of NGC 531

Observation data (J2000 epoch)
- Constellation: Andromeda
- Right ascension: 01^{h} 26^{m} 18.805^{s}
- Declination: +34° 45′ 14.93″
- Redshift: 0.015667
- Heliocentric radial velocity: 4660 km/s
- Distance: 205.5 Mly (63.00 Mpc)
- Apparent magnitude (B): 14.86

Characteristics
- Type: SB0/a:

Other designations
- UGC 1012, MCG +06-04-020, PGC 5340

NGC 531 is a barred spiral galaxy in the constellation Andromeda with a visual magnitude of 10.51. It is a distance of 65.7 Mpc from the Sun. It is a member of the Hickson Compact Group HCG 10, and is interacting with the other members of the group.
