= NGC 1154 =

Barred spiral galaxy in the constellation Eridanus

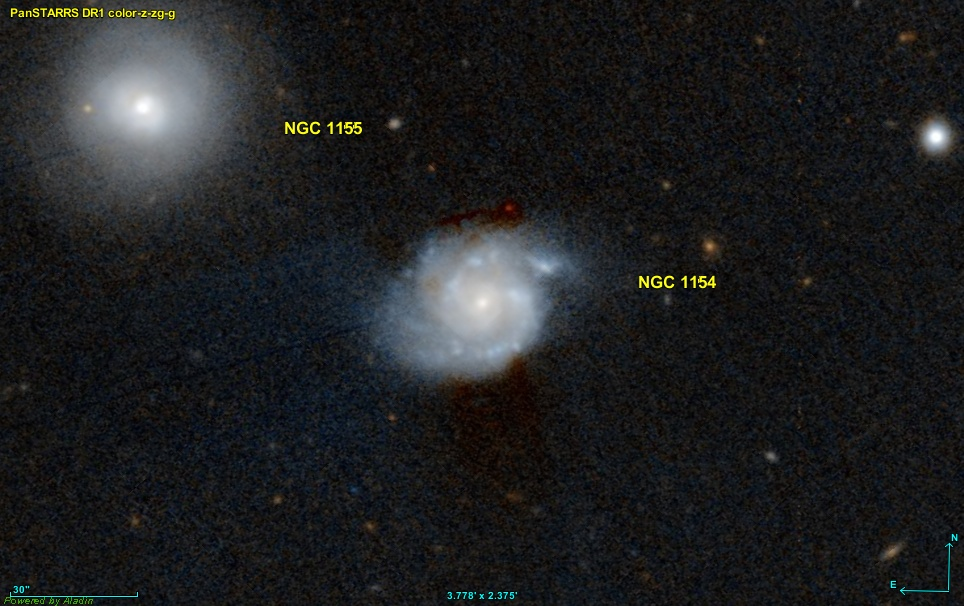
- Image of NGC 1154 from the Pan-STARRS survey

Observation data (J2000 epoch)
- Right ascension: 02^{h} 58^{m} 07.697^{s}
- Declination: −10° 21′ 47.79″
- Distance: 200 million light-years (62.26 Mpc)
- Apparent magnitude (V): 13.6

Characteristics
- Type: SB(rs)b

Other designations
- MCG-02-08-045, PGC 11215

NGC 1154 is a barred spiral galaxy located in the constellation Eridanus. It lies approximately 200 million light-years (62.26 Mpc) away from Earth. The galaxy was discovered by the American astronomer Francis Preserved Leavenworth on December 2, 1885 as part of his deep-sky surveys. Modern observations have been carried out by surveys such as the Pan-STARRS and Sloan Digital Sky Survey (SDSS). It has an apparent magnitude of 13.6, making it relatively faint and observable primarily with large telescopes.

NGC 1154 is classified as an SB(rs)b galaxy, indicating that it is a barred spiral galaxy with a somewhat ring-like structure and closely wound spiral arms. It is positioned close to the galaxy NGC 1155, with which it may be interacting. A faint bridge of material appears to connect the two galaxies, suggesting tidal forces may be at play.

One supernova has been observed in NGC 1154: SN 2011jp (Type II-P, mag. 15.5) was discovered by Greg Bock on 27 December 2011.
