= Arp 144 =

Arp 144 may refer to:

- NGC 7828, a peculiar galaxy in the constellation Cetus
- NGC 7829, a lenticular galaxy in the constellation Cetus
