= NGC 539 =

Galaxy in the constellation Cetus

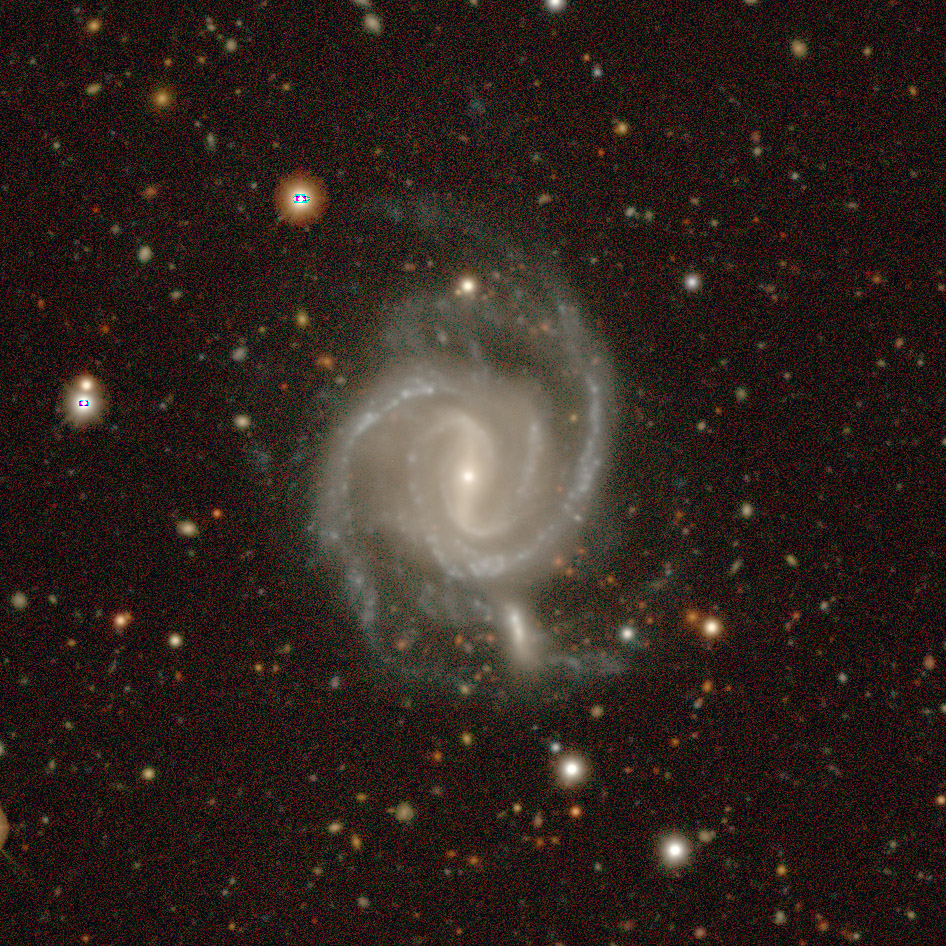
- legacy surveys image of NGC 539

Observation data (J2000 epoch)
- Constellation: Cetus
- Right ascension: 01^{h} 25^{m} 21.73827^{s}
- Declination: −18° 09′ 49.9592″
- Redshift: 0.032528
- Heliocentric radial velocity: 9593.1 km/s
- Distance: 440 Mly (134.8 Mpc)
- Apparent magnitude (B): 14.32

Characteristics
- Type: SB(rs)c
- Size: ~285,900 ly (87.67 kpc) (estimated)

Other designations
- ESO 542- G 010, IRAS 01229-1825, 2MASX J01252171-1809499, MCG -03-04-063, PGC 5269

NGC 539 is a barred spiral galaxy in the constellation of Cetus south. It is estimated to be 429 million light years from the Milky Way and has a diameter of approximately 286,000 ly. It was discovered on 31 October 1885 by American astronomer Francis Leavenworth.

== See also ==
- List of NGC objects (1–1000)
