= NGC 690 =

Spiral galaxy in the constellation Cetus

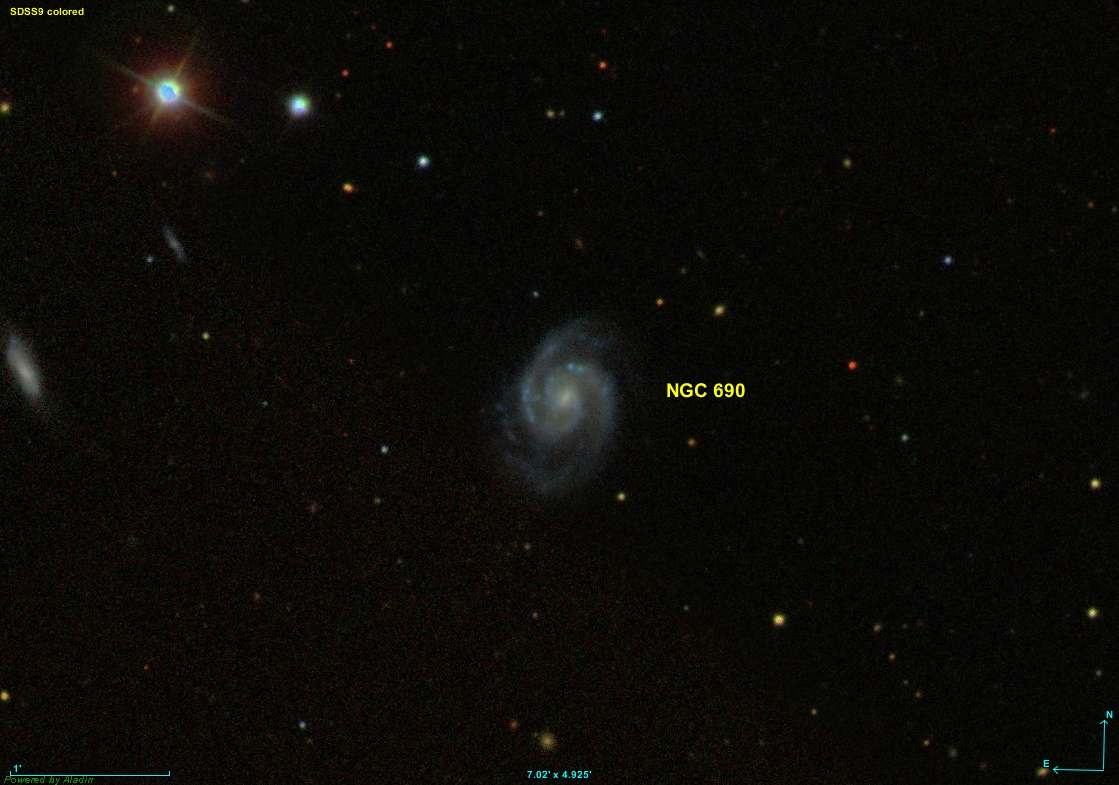
- NGC 690 imaged by the Sloan Digital Sky Survey

Observation data (J2000 epoch)
- Constellation: Cetus
- Right ascension: 01^{h} 47^{m} 48.074^{s}
- Declination: −16° 43′ 19.88″
- Redshift: 0.01721±0.00003
- Heliocentric radial velocity: 5,160.03±9.89 km/s
- Distance: 235.6 ± 16.5 Mly (72.25 ± 5.07 Mpc)

Characteristics
- Type: SAB(s)c:

Other designations
- AGC 410352, LEDA 6587

NGC 690 is an intermediate spiral galaxy located in the constellation Cetus about 236 million light-years from the Milky Way. It was discovered by the American astronomer Francis Leavenworth in 1885.
