= NGC 478 =

Spiral galaxy in the constellation Cetus

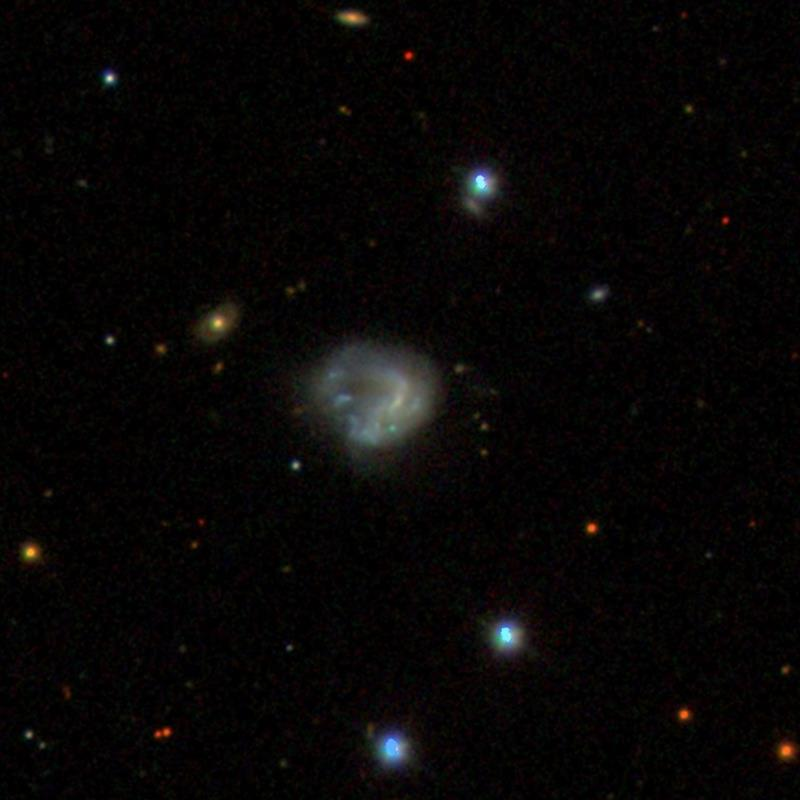
- SDSS view of NGC 478

Observation data (J2000 epoch)
- Constellation: Cetus
- Right ascension: 01^{h} 20^{m} 09.29^{s}
- Declination: −22° 22′ 38.6″
- Redshift: 0.022857
- Heliocentric radial velocity: 6774 km/s
- Distance: 283 Mly
- Apparent magnitude (V): 13.7

Characteristics
- Type: S pec
- Apparent size (V): 0.8′ × 0.7′

Other designations
- PGC 4803, MCG -04-04-005, 2MASX J01200883-2222386

NGC 478 is a spiral galaxy in the constellation Cetus. It is located approximately 283 million light-years from Earth and was discovered in 1886 by astronomer Francis Preserved Leavenworth.

== See also ==
- List of NGC objects (1–1000)
