= NGC 320 =

Galaxy located in the constellation Cetus

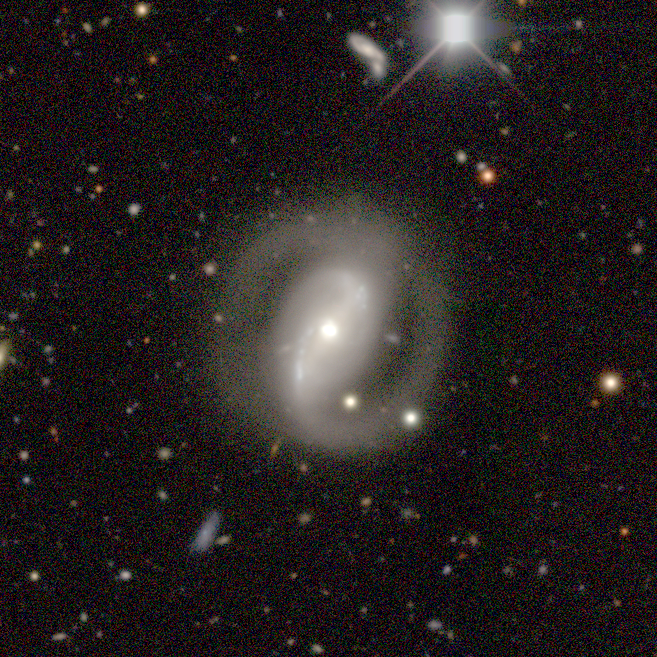
- NGC 320 imaged by DECam

Observation data (J2000 epoch)
- Constellation: Cetus
- Right ascension: 00^{h} 58^{m} 46.5307^{s}
- Declination: −20° 50′ 24.134″
- Redshift: 0.018379±0.000100
- Heliocentric radial velocity: 5,510±30 km/s
- Distance: 251.0 ± 17.7 Mly (76.97 ± 5.43 Mpc)
- Apparent magnitude (V): 14.73

Characteristics
- Type: SB0/a
- Size: ~111,200 ly (34.08 kpc) (estimated)
- Apparent size (V): 0.9′ × 0.5′

Other designations
- ESO 541- G 003, ESO-LV 5410030, 6dF J0058465-205024, IRAS 00563-2106, 2MASX J00584655-2050245, MCG -04-03-037, PGC 3510

NGC 320 is a spiral galaxy in the constellation Cetus. Its velocity with respect to the cosmic microwave background is 5,218±36 km/s, which corresponds to a Hubble distance of 251.0 ± 17.7 Mly (76.97 ± 5.43 Mpc). It was discovered by American astronomer Francis Leavenworth in 1886.

NGC 7154 is a Seyfert I galaxy, i.e. it has a quasar-like nucleus with very high surface brightnesses whose spectra reveal strong, high-ionisation emission lines, but unlike quasars, the host galaxy is clearly detectable.

== Supernova ==
One supernova has been observed in NGC 320: SN 2026nwg (Type II, mag. 17.359) was discovered by ATLAS on 27 May 2026.

== See also ==
- List of NGC objects (1–1000)
