= NGC 635 =

Galaxy in the constellation of Cetus

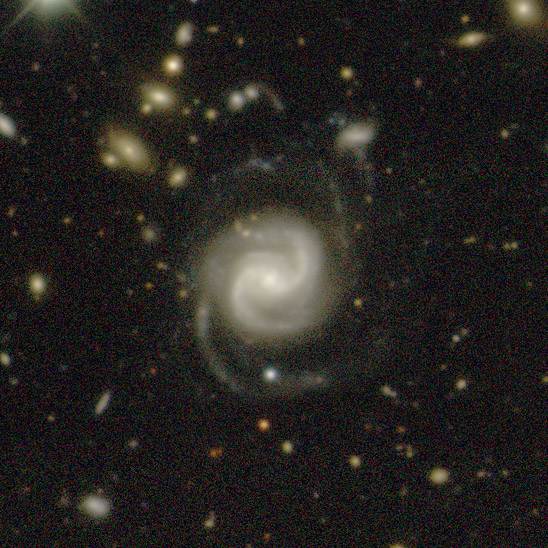
- DECam image of NGC 635

Observation data (J2000 epoch)
- Constellation: Cetus
- Right ascension: 01^{h} 38^{m} 17.86^{s}
- Declination: −22° 55′ 44.1″
- Redshift: 0.04673
- Heliocentric radial velocity: 14010 km/s
- Distance: 661.7 ± 46.4 Mly (202.88 ± 14.22 Mpc)

Characteristics
- Type: Sb(s)ab HII

Other designations
- MCG -04-05-002, PGC 6062

NGC 635 is a spiral galaxy located in the constellation of Cetus about 626 million light years from the Milky Way. NGC 635 was discovered by the American astronomer Francis Leavenworth in 1885. It is also known as MCG-04-05-002 or PGC 6062, although in SIMBAD its New General Catalogue designation is not recognized.

== See also ==
- List of NGC objects (1–1000)
