= NGC 209 =

Galaxy in the constellation Cetus

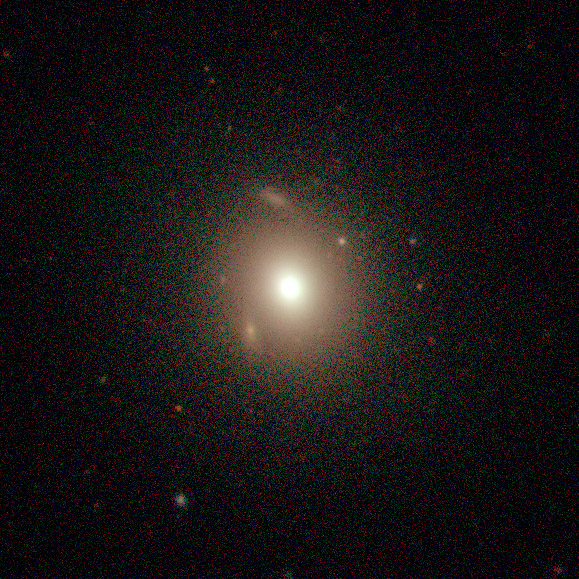
- NGC 209 as seen with DECam

Observation data (J2000 epoch)
- Constellation: Cetus
- Right ascension: 00^{h} 39^{m} 03.6^{s}
- Declination: −18° 36′ 30″
- Redshift: 0.013112
- Distance: 175 Mly
- Apparent magnitude (V): 14.74

Characteristics
- Type: SA0^{−} pec:
- Apparent size (V): 1.4' × 1.1'

Other designations
- ESO 540- G 008, MCG -03-02-031, 2MASX J00390357-1836299, 2MASXi J0039035-183629, ESO-LV 5400080, PGC 2338.

NGC 209 is a lenticular galaxy located approximately 175 million light-years from the Solar System in the constellation Cetus. It was discovered on October 9, 1885, by Francis Leavenworth.

== See also ==
- List of NGC objects (1–1000)
