= NGC 166 =

Spiral galaxy in the constellation Cetus

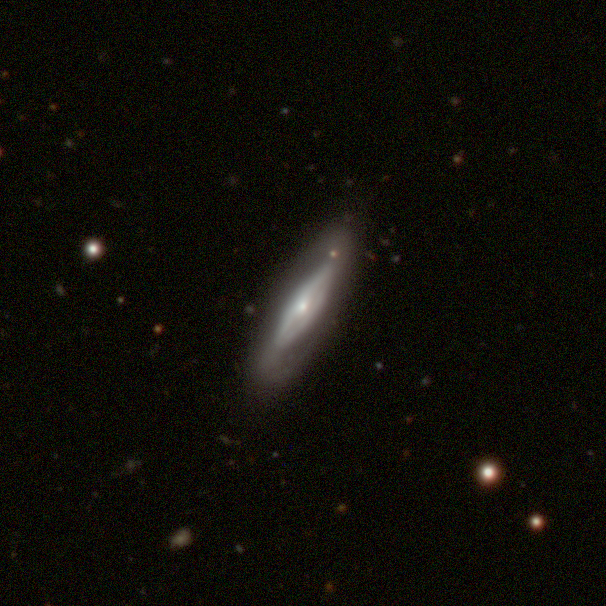
- DECam image of NGC 166

Observation data (J2000 epoch)
- Constellation: Cetus
- Right ascension: 00^{h} 35^{m} 48.8^{s}
- Declination: −13° 36′ 38″
- Redshift: 0.020084
- Apparent magnitude (V): 15.18

Characteristics
- Type: Sa
- Apparent size (V): 0.9' × 0.3'

Other designations
- PGC 2143.

NGC 166 (also known as PGC 2143) is a spiral galaxy located around 2.6 million light-years away in the constellation Cetus, with an apparent magnitude of 15.18. It was discovered by Francis Preserved Leavenworth in 1886.

== See also ==
- Spiral galaxy
- List of NGC objects (1–1000)
- Cetus (constellation)
