= NGC 905 =

Galaxy in the constellation Cetus

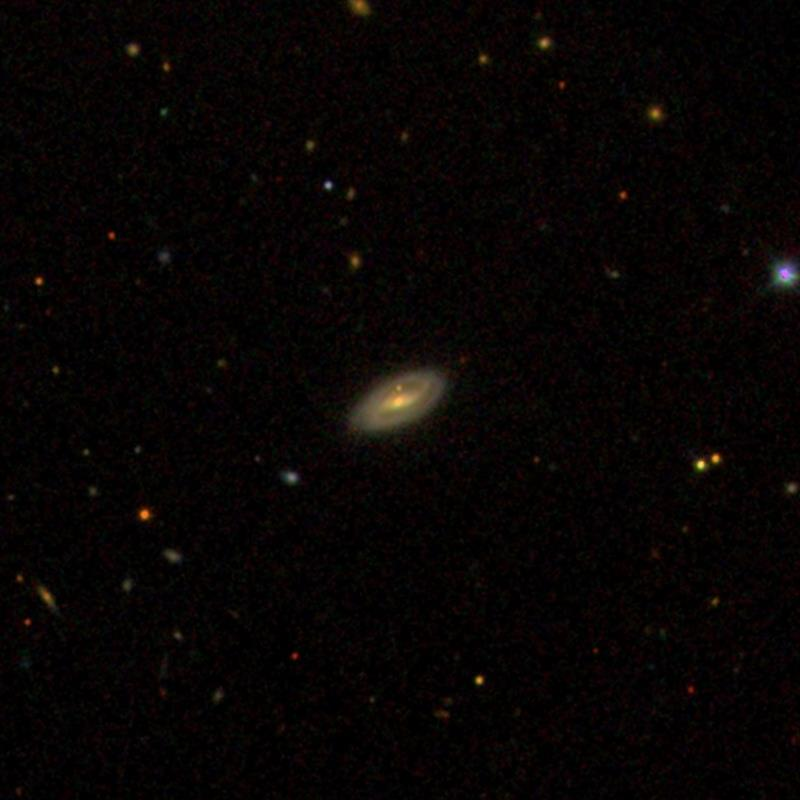
- SDSS image of NGC 905

Observation data (J2000 epoch)
- Constellation: Cetus
- Right ascension: 02^{h} 22^{m} 43.574^{s}
- Declination: −08° 43′ 08.46″
- Redshift: 0.04551
- Heliocentric radial velocity: 13333 km/s
- Distance: 644.8 ± 45.2 Mly (197.70 ± 13.85 Mpc)
- Apparent magnitude (B): 15.70

Characteristics
- Type: S0-a

Other designations
- PGC 9038

NGC 905 is a lenticular galaxy with an active nucleus in the constellation Cetus south. It is estimated to be 644 million light-years from the Milky Way and has a diameter of approximately 85,000 ly. NGC 905 was discovered by astronomer Francis Leavenworth.

== See also ==
- List of NGC objects (1–1000)
