= NGC 540 =

Lenticular galaxy in the constellation Cetus

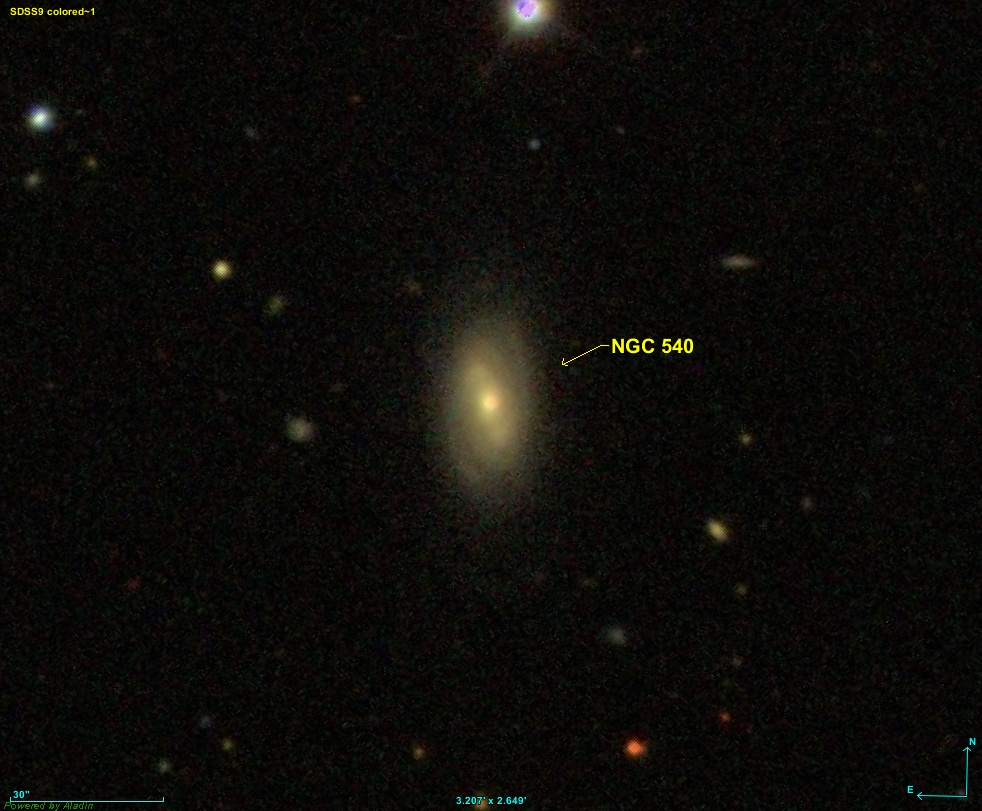
- NGC 540 imaged by the Sloan Digital Sky Survey

Observation data (J2000 epoch)
- Constellation: Cetus
- Right ascension: 01^{h} 27^{m} 08.90558^{s}
- Declination: −20° 02′ 11.7187″
- Redshift: 0.033700±0.000213
- Heliocentric radial velocity: 10,103±89 km/s

Characteristics
- Type: SB(s)0:
- Apparent size (V): 2.5 × 2.0 arcmin

Other designations
- LEDA 5410, PGC 5410, SGC 012444-2017.7

NGC 540 is a barred lenticular galaxy in the constellation Cetus. It is estimated to be 451 million light years from the Milky Way and has a diameter of approximately 120,000 light years. The object was discovered on October 15, 1885, by the American astronomer Francis Preserved Leavenworth.

== See also ==
- List of NGC objects (1–1000)
