= NGC 880 =

Galaxy in the constellation Cetus

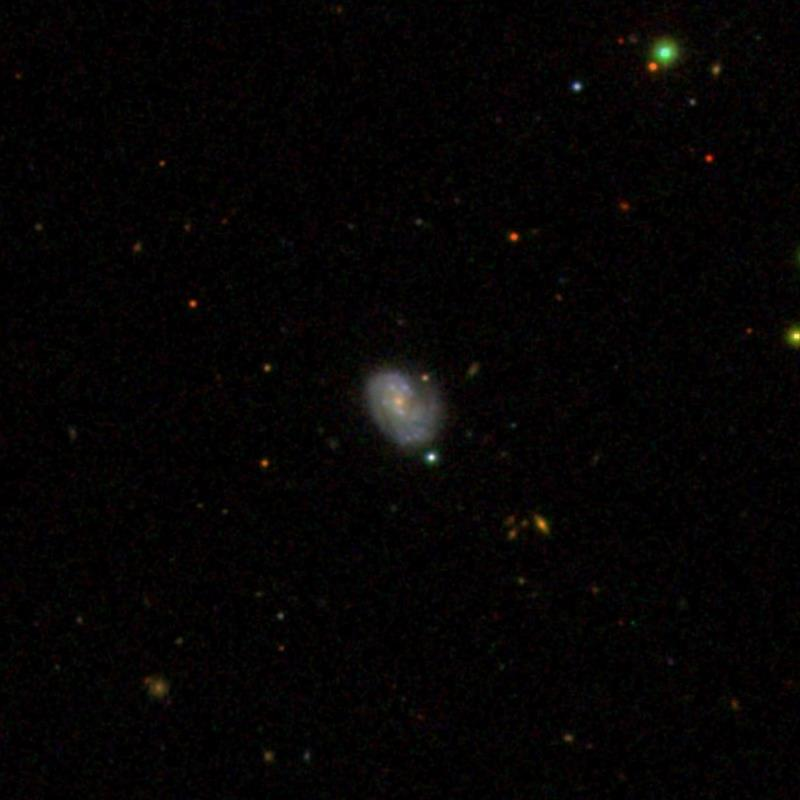
- SDSS image of NGC 880

Observation data (J2000 epoch)
- Constellation: Cetus
- Right ascension: 02^{h} 18^{m} 27.253^{s}
- Declination: −04° 12′ 19.44″
- Redshift: 0.041656
- Heliocentric radial velocity: 12228 km/s
- Distance: 586.9 ± 41.1 Mly (179.93 ± 12.61 Mpc)
- Apparent magnitude (V): 15.11
- Apparent magnitude (B): 15.61

Characteristics
- Type: S?

Other designations
- PGC 8805

NGC 880 is a spiral galaxy located in the constellation Cetus about 590 million light-years from the Milky Way. It was discovered by the American astronomer Francis Leavenworth in 1886.

== See also ==
- List of NGC objects (1–1000)
