= NGC 303 =

Galaxy located in the constellation Cetus

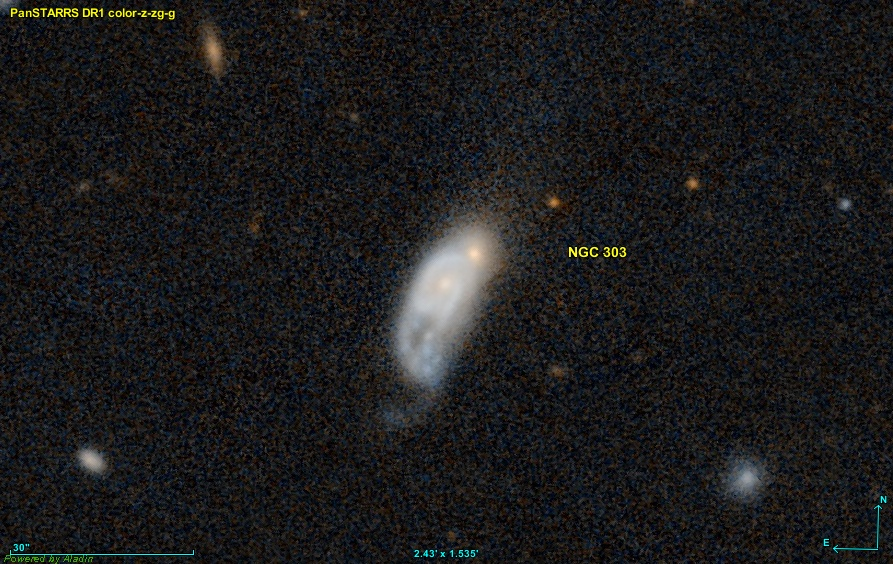

Observation data (J2000 epoch)
- Constellation: Cetus
- Right ascension: 00^{h} 54^{m} 54.7^{s}
- Declination: −16° 39′ 17″
- Redshift: 0.032489
- Heliocentric radial velocity: 9,740 km/s
- Apparent magnitude (V): 15.15

Characteristics
- Type: S0
- Apparent size (V): 0.6' × 0.4'

Other designations
- 2MASX J00545443-1639126, 2MASX J00545471-1639166, 2MASXi J0054547-163916, IRAS F00524-1655, 6dF J0054547-163917, PGC 3240.

NGC 303 is a lenticular galaxy in the constellation Cetus. It was discovered in 1886 by Francis Leavenworth.
