= NGC 167 =

Spiral galaxy in the constellation Cetus

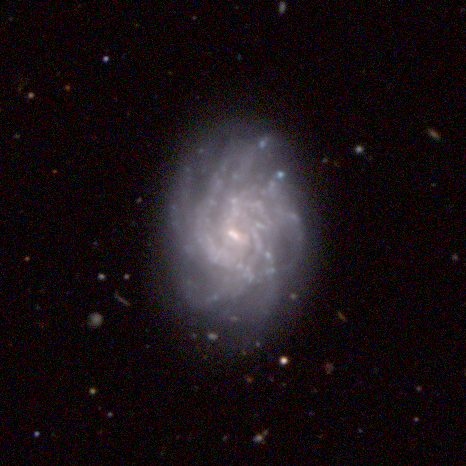
- NGC 167 with DECam

Observation data (J2000 epoch)
- Constellation: Cetus
- Right ascension: 00^{h} 35^{m} 23.1^{s}
- Declination: −23° 22′ 30″
- Redshift: 0.012812
- Distance: 172 Mly
- Apparent magnitude (V): 13.98

Characteristics
- Type: Sbc
- Apparent size (V): 1.0' × 0.7'

Other designations
- PGC 2122

NGC 167 is a spiral galaxy located approximately 172 million light-years from the Solar System in the constellation Cetus. It was discovered in 1886 by Francis Preserved Leavenworth.

== See also ==
- List of NGC objects (1–1000)
