= NGC 239 =

Spiral galaxy in the constellation Cetus

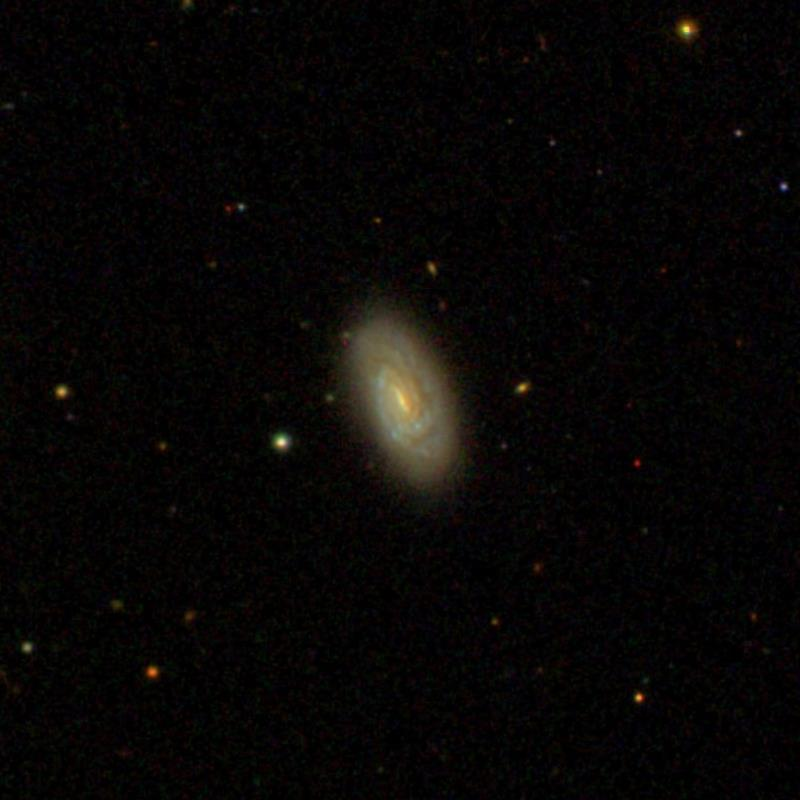
- SDSS image of NGC 239

Observation data (J2000 epoch)
- Constellation: Cetus
- Right ascension: 00^{h} 44^{m} 37.5^{s}
- Declination: −03° 45′ 33″
- Redshift: 0.012632
- Apparent magnitude (V): 14.21

Characteristics
- Type: Sab
- Apparent size (V): 1.0' × 0.5'

Other designations
- MCG -01-03-007, 2MASX J00443751-0345332, 2MASXi J0044374-034533, IRAS 00420-0401, F00420-0402, 6dF J0044375-034533, PGC 2642.

NGC 239 (also known as the Bafanasev Galaxy) is a grand design spiral galaxy located in the constellation Cetus. It was discovered in 1886 by Francis Leavenworth.
