= NGC 734 =

Galaxy in the constellation Cetus

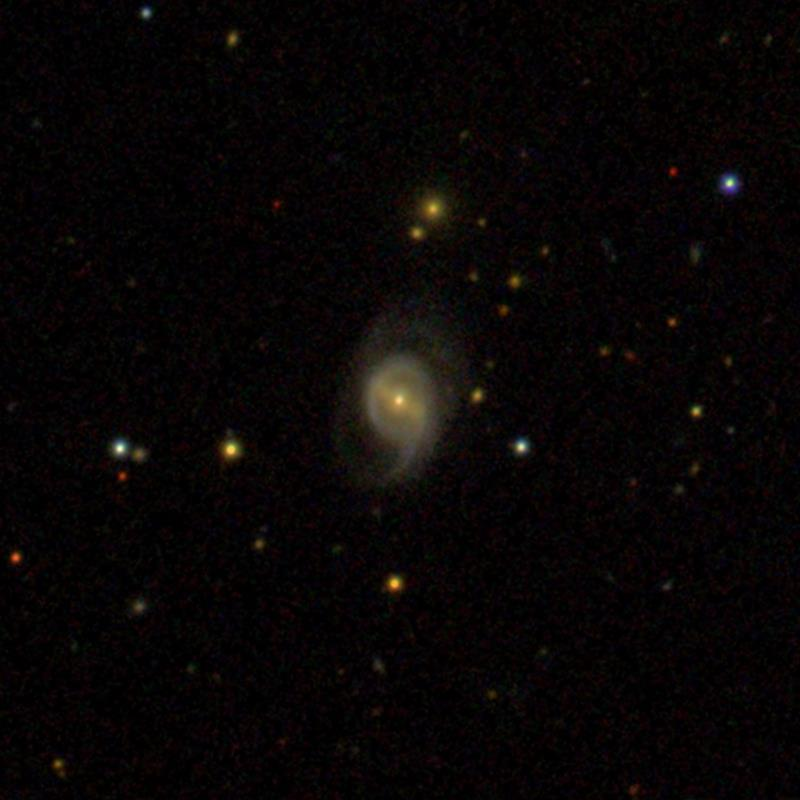
- SDSS image of NGC 734

Observation data (J2000 epoch)
- Constellation: Cetus
- Right ascension: 01^{h} 53^{m} 28.755118^{s}
- Declination: −16° 59′ 44.8274″
- Redshift: 0.040824
- Heliocentric radial velocity: 11989 km/s
- Distance: 540 Mly (166 Mpc)
- Apparent magnitude (B): 15.36

Characteristics
- Type: SB0-a

Other designations
- GSC 05856-01688, PGC 170023

NGC 734 is a lenticular galaxy with a central bar in the constellation Cetus, which is about 538 million light years from the Milky Way. It was discovered on November 9, 1885, by the American astronomer Francis Preserved Leavenworth.

NGC 734 was identified as PGC 170023, but is often misidentified as PGC 7121. SIMBAD also shows the position of NGC 734 as PGC 7121.

== See also ==
- List of NGC objects (1–1000)
