= NGC 1190 =

Galaxy in the constellation Eridanus

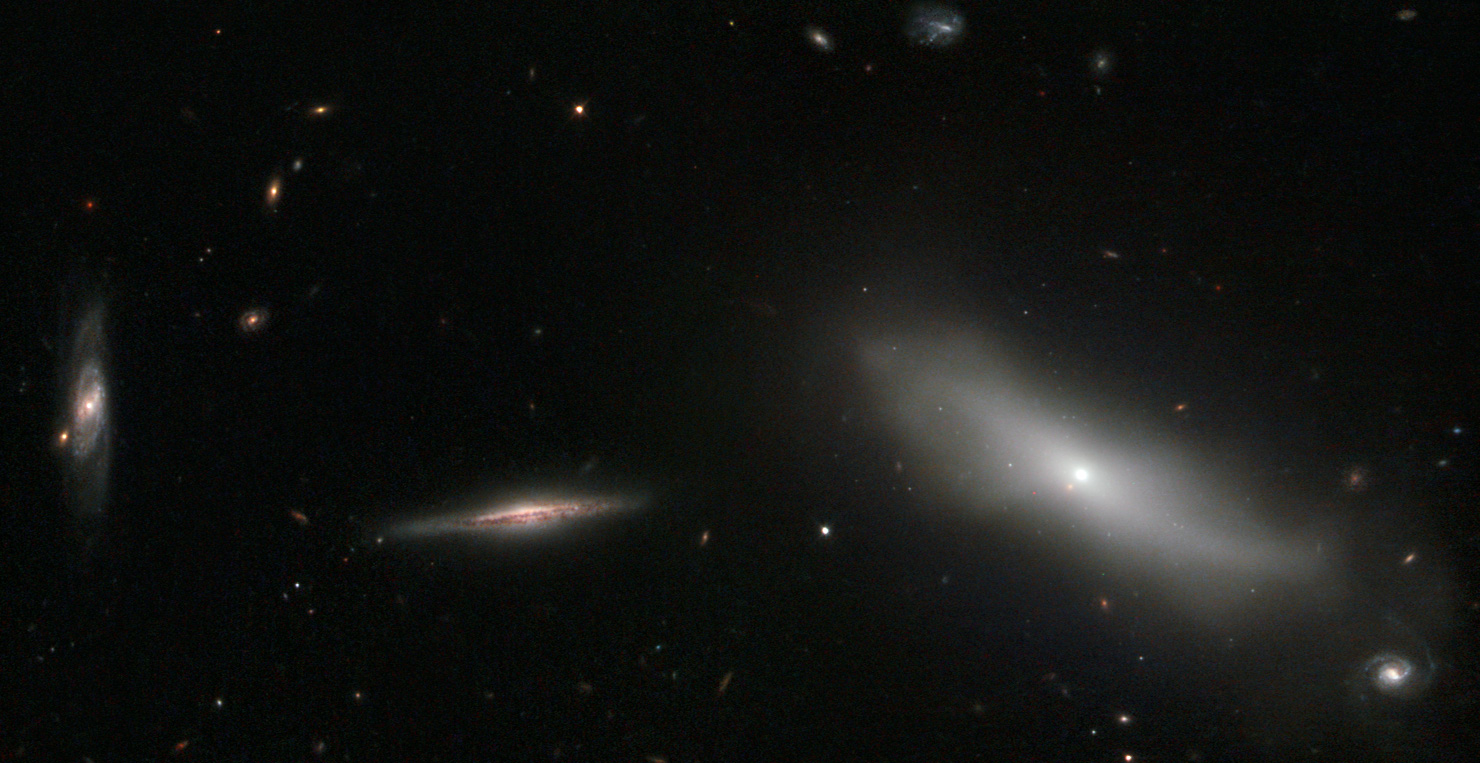
- NGC 1190 (right) as seen by (NASA/ESA HST)

Observation data (J2000.0 epoch)
- Constellation: Eridanus
- Right ascension: 03^{h} 03^{m} 26.13^{s}
- Declination: −15° 39′ 42.80″
- Redshift: 0.008733
- Heliocentric radial velocity: 2618 ± 27 km/s
- Distance: 109 Mly
- Apparent magnitude (V): 14.20
- Apparent magnitude (B): 15.20

Characteristics
- Type: S0^0
- Apparent size (V): 0.9 x 0.3

Other designations
- PGC 11508, MCG -3-8-62, HCG 22B

NGC 1190 is a lenticular galaxy approximately 109 million light-years away from Earth in the constellation of Eridanus. It was discovered by American astronomer Francis Leavenworth on December 2, 1885 with the 26" refractor at Leander McCormick Observatory.

NGC 1190 is dominated by stellar light with little long wavelength emission.

Together with NGC 1189, NGC 1191, NGC 1192 and NGC 1199 it forms Hickson Compact Group 22 (HCG 22) galaxy group. Although they are considered members of this group, NGC 1191 and NGC 1192 are in fact background objects, since they are much further away compared to the other members of this group.

== Image gallery ==
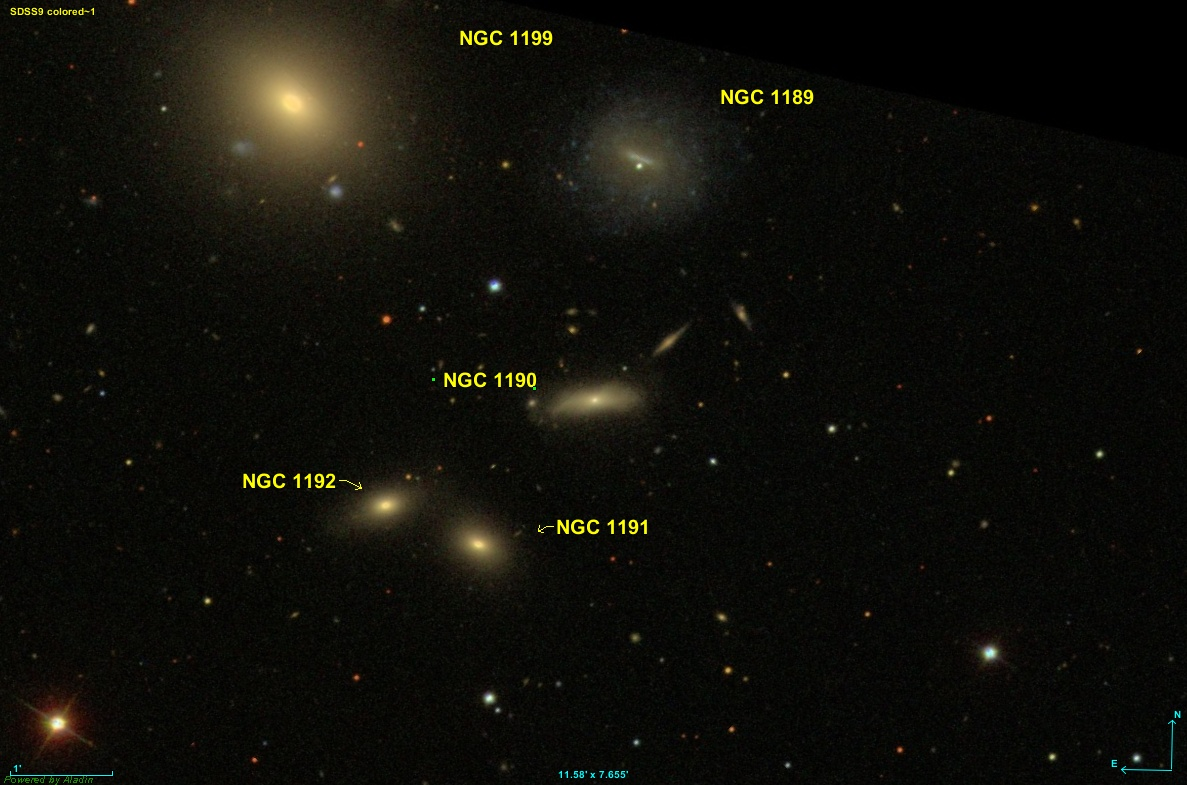
NGC 1190 with other members of the HCG 22 galaxy group (SDSS)

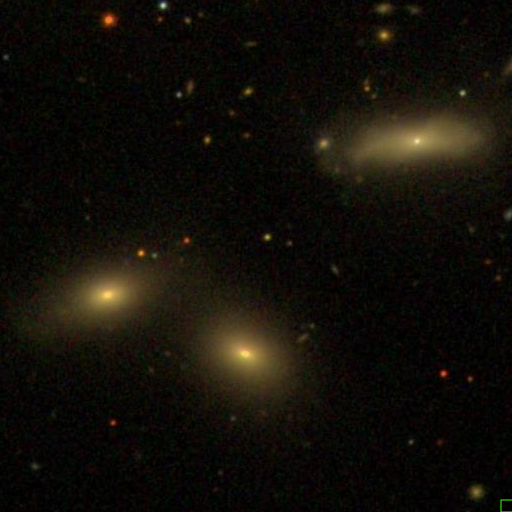
NGC 1190 (upper right) and nearby galaxies (SDSS)

== See also ==
- Lenticular galaxy
- Hickson Compact Group
- List of NGC objects (1001–2000)
- Eridanus (constellation)
