= NGC 1163 =

Spiral galaxy in the constellation Eridanus

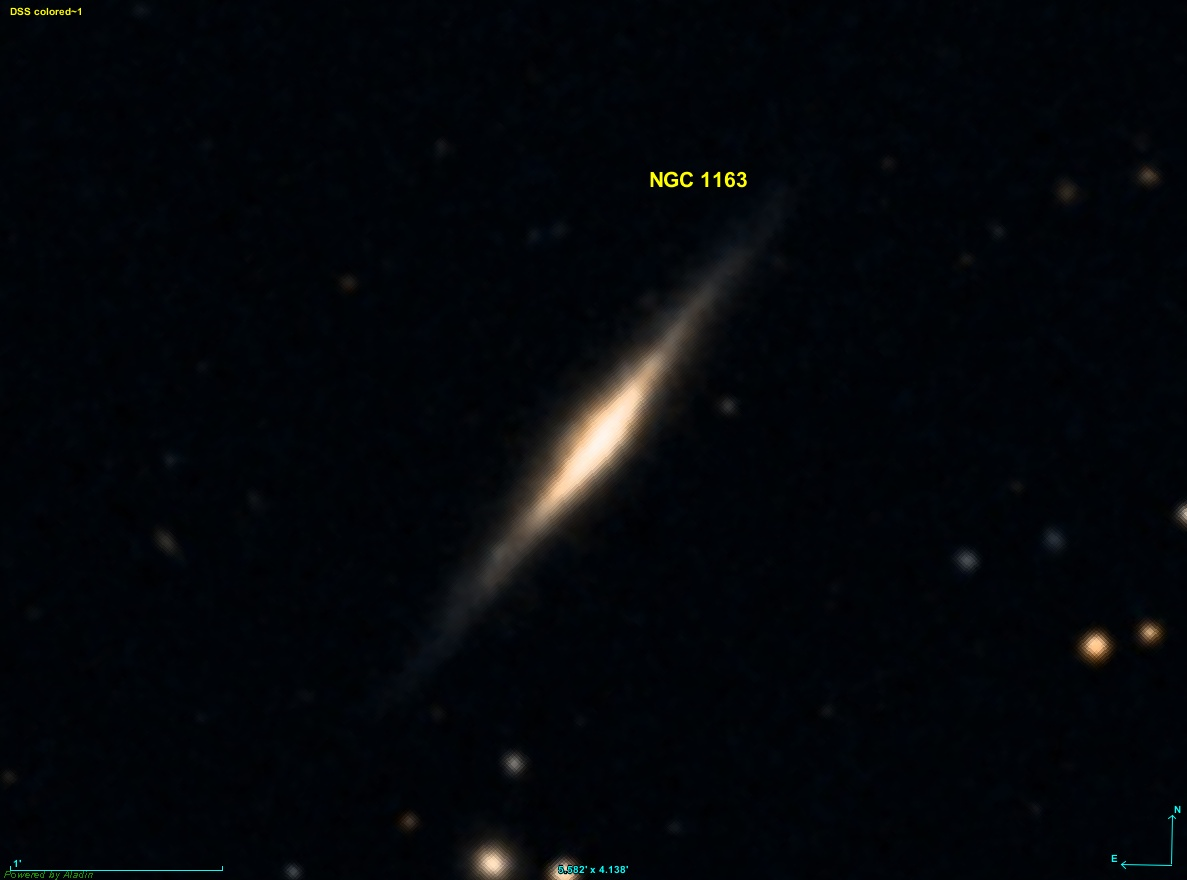
- NGC 1163 as observed by the Digitized Sky Survey

Observation data (J2000 epoch)
- Constellation: Eridanus
- Redshift: 0.007609
- Distance: 31 Mpc
- Apparent magnitude (V): ~14

Characteristics
- Type: SBbc?
- Apparent size (V): 162"

Other designations
- LEDA 11359

NGC 1163 is a barred spiral galaxy located in the constellation Eridanus. It is situated approximately 31 million parsecs away from Earth and has an apparent magnitude of about 14. The galaxy was discovered by the American astronomer Francis Leavenworth on October 31, 1885.

== Discovery ==
NGC 1163 was first observed by Francis Leavenworth on October 31, 1885. The galaxy was later cataloged in the New General Catalogue (NGC) by John Louis Emil Dreyer.
