= NGC 811 =

Elliptical galaxy in the constellation Cetus

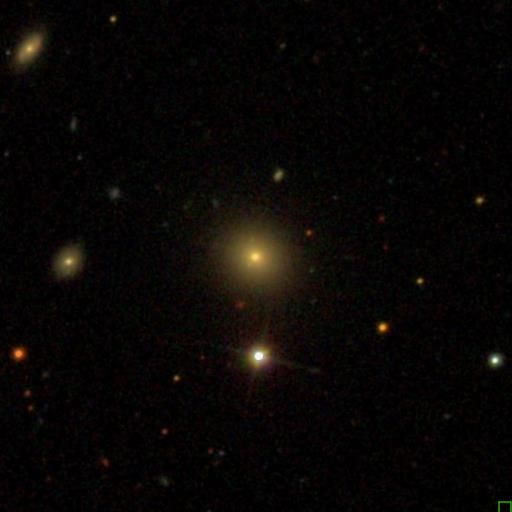
- SDSS image of NGC 811 (PGC 7870)

Observation data (J2000 epoch)
- Constellation: Cetus
- Right ascension: 02^{h} 04^{m} 00.01284^{s}
- Declination: −09° 06′ 21.4094″
- Redshift: 0.04884
- Heliocentric radial velocity: 14285 km/s
- Distance: 692.9 ± 48.5 Mly (212.44 ± 14.88 Mpc)
- Apparent magnitude (B): 16.5

Characteristics
- Type: E

Other designations
- KUG 0201-093, PGC 7870

NGC 811 is an object in the New General Catalogue. It is an elliptical galaxy located in the constellation Cetus about 700 million light-years from the Milky Way. It was discovered by the American astronomer Francis Leavenworth in 1886. However, it is usually misidentified as a different object, the spiral galaxy PGC 7905.

== See also ==
- List of NGC objects (1–1000)
