= NGC 960 =

Spiral galaxy in the constellation Cetus

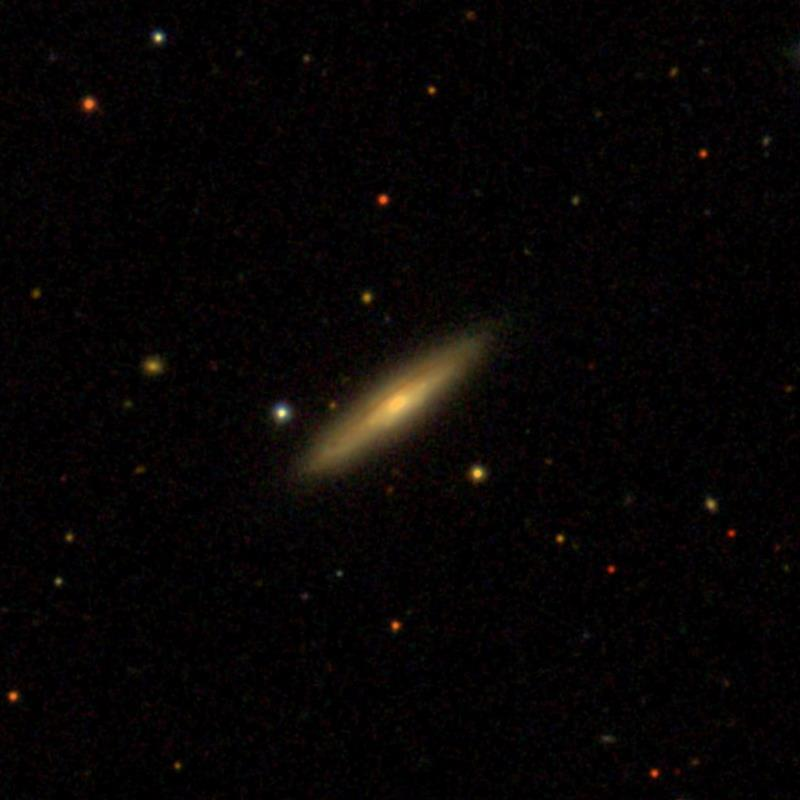
- SDSS image of NGC 960

Observation data (J2000 epoch)
- Constellation: Cetus
- Right ascension: 02^{h} 31^{m} 41.302^{s}
- Declination: −09° 18′ 01.01″
- Redshift: 0.016233
- Heliocentric radial velocity: 4827 km/s
- Distance: 185.1 Mly (56.75 Mpc)
- Apparent magnitude (B): 14.78

Characteristics
- Type: SABb

Other designations
- MCG -02-07-028, PGC 9621

NGC 960 is a spiral galaxy in the constellation Cetus. The galaxy was discovered in 1886 by Francis Preserved Leavenworth.

== See also ==
- List of NGC objects (1–1000)
