= NGC 1189 =

Galaxy in the constellation Eridanus

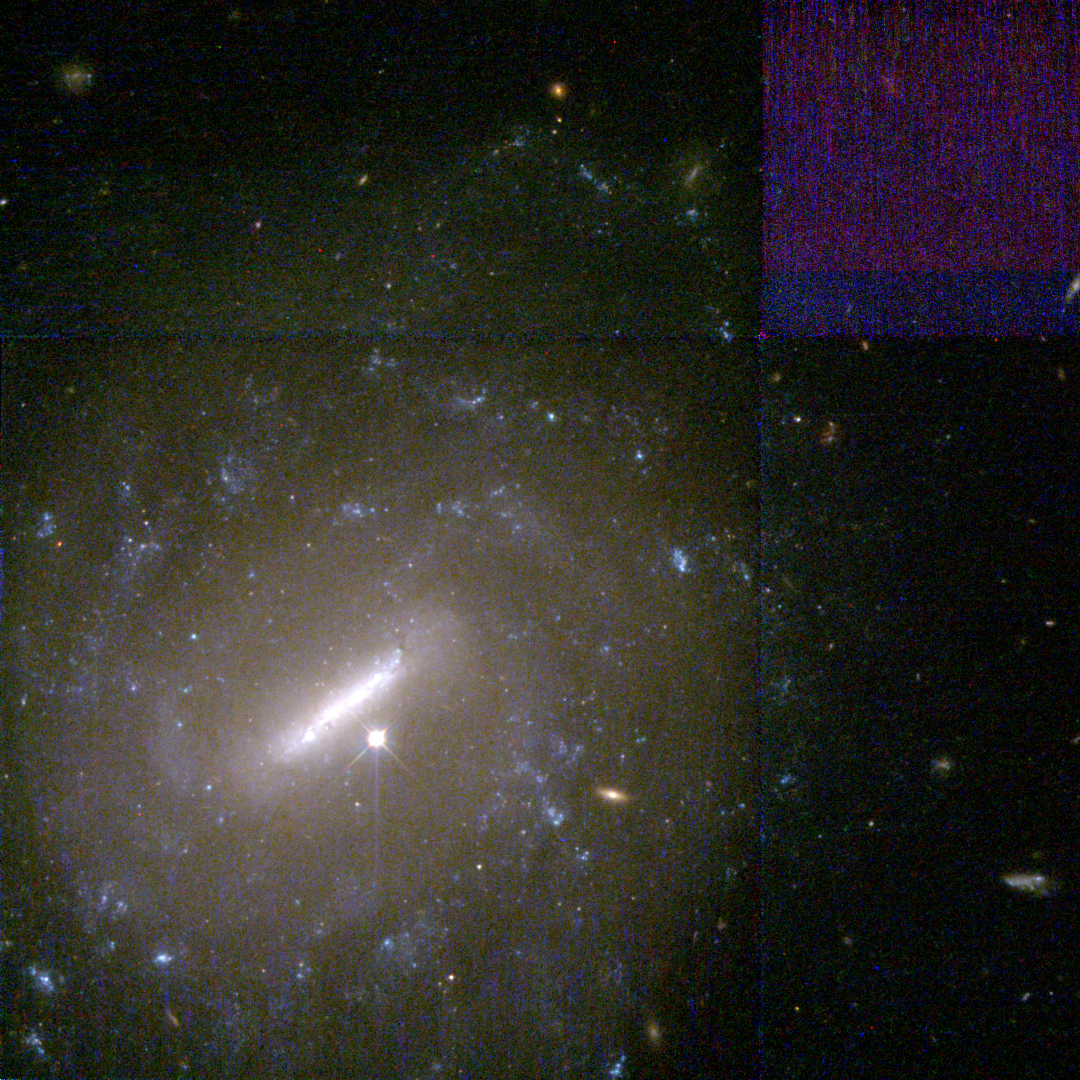
- NGC 1189 (NASA/ESA HST)

Observation data (J2000.0 epoch)
- Constellation: Eridanus
- Right ascension: 03^{h} 03^{m} 24.47^{s}
- Declination: −15° 37′ 24.48″
- Redshift: 0.008486
- Heliocentric radial velocity: 2544 ± 1 km/s
- Distance: 105 Mly
- Apparent magnitude (V): 13.80
- Apparent magnitude (B): 14.50

Characteristics
- Type: SB(s)dm:
- Apparent size (V): 1.7 x 1.5

Other designations
- PGC 11503, MCG -3-8-61, HCG 22C

NGC 1189 is a barred spiral galaxy approximately 105 million light-years away from Earth in the constellation of Eridanus. It was discovered by American astronomer Francis Leavenworth on December 2, 1885 with the 26" refractor at Leander McCormick Observatory.

NGC 1189 has extended clumpy star formation throughout its spiral arms with remarkably little associated stellar light, which is striking in the color images.

Together with NGC 1190, NGC 1191, NGC 1192 and NGC 1199 it forms Hickson Compact Group 22 (HCG 22) galaxy group. Although they are considered members of this group, NGC 1191 and NGC 1192 are in fact background objects, since they are much further away compared to the other members of this group.

== Image gallery ==
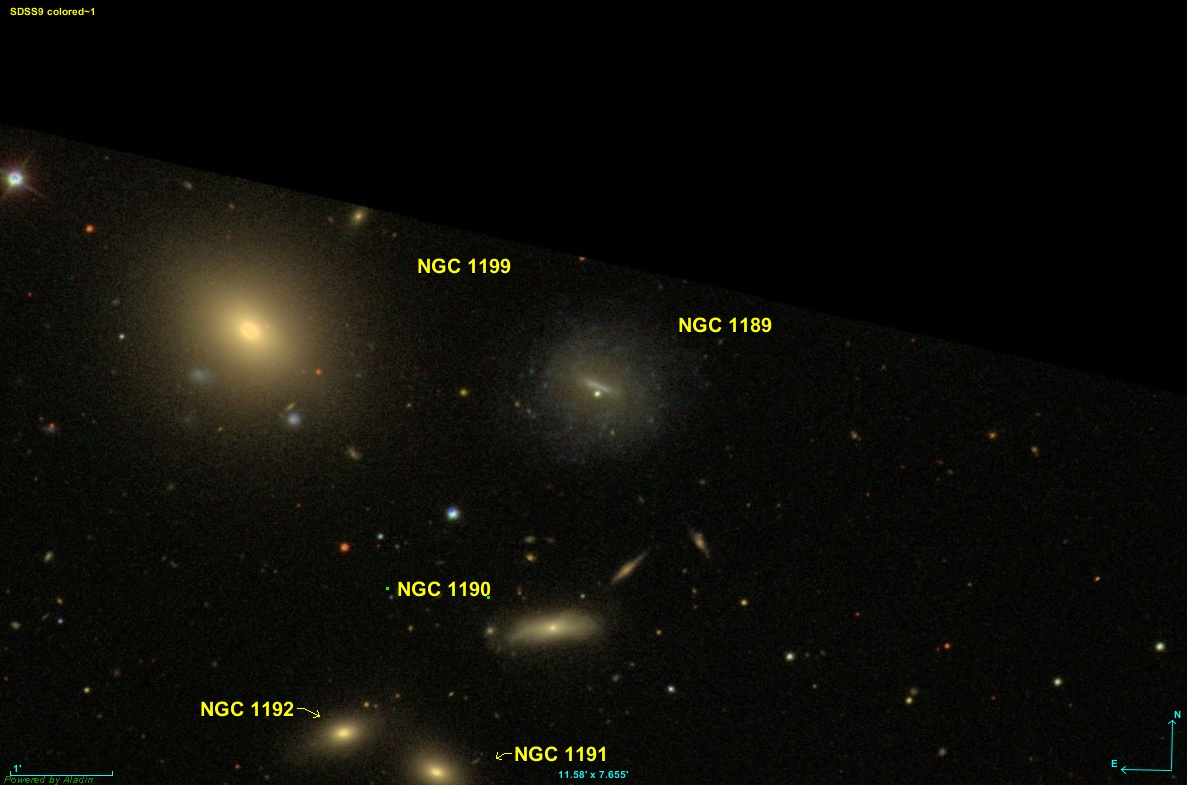
NGC 1189 with other members of the HCG 22 galaxy group (SDSS)

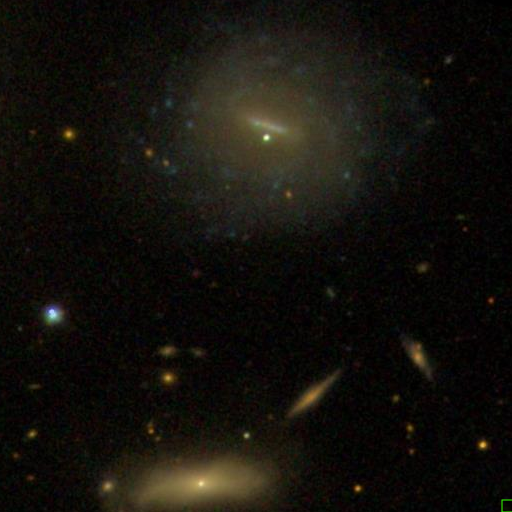
NGC 1189 and nearby galaxies (SDSS)

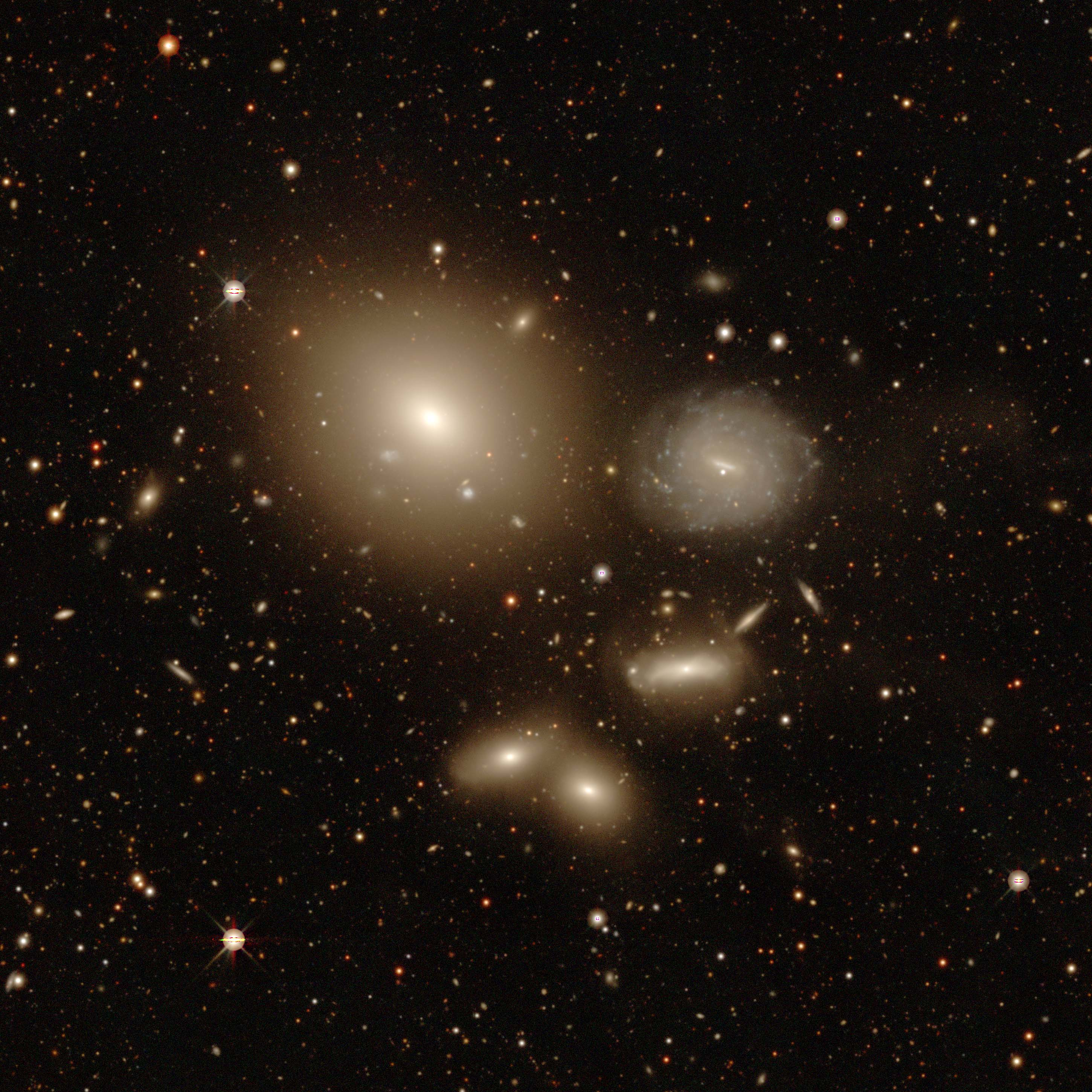
Complete view of HCG 22 with legacy surveys

== See also ==
- Barred spiral galaxy
- Hickson Compact Group
- List of NGC objects (1001–2000)
- Eridanus (constellation)
