= NGC 263 =

Spiral galaxy in the constellation Cetus

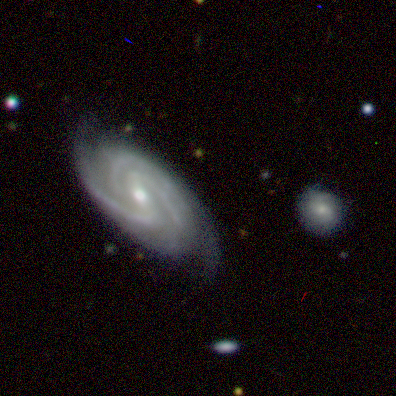
- DECam image of NGC 263. The smaller galaxy is LEDA 942807.

Observation data (J2000 epoch)
- Constellation: Cetus
- Right ascension: 00^{h} 48^{m} 48.5^{s}
- Declination: −13° 06′ 27″
- Redshift: 0.029000
- Apparent magnitude (V): 15.00

Characteristics
- Type: Sbc
- Apparent size (V): 0.6′ × 0.3′

Other designations
- MCG -02-03-021, 2MASX J00484847-1306266, IRAS F00463-1322, 6dF J0048485-130627, PGC 2856.

NGC 263 is a spiral galaxy located in the constellation Cetus. It was discovered in 1886 by Francis Leavenworth.
