= NGC 725 =

Spiral galaxy in the constellation Cetus

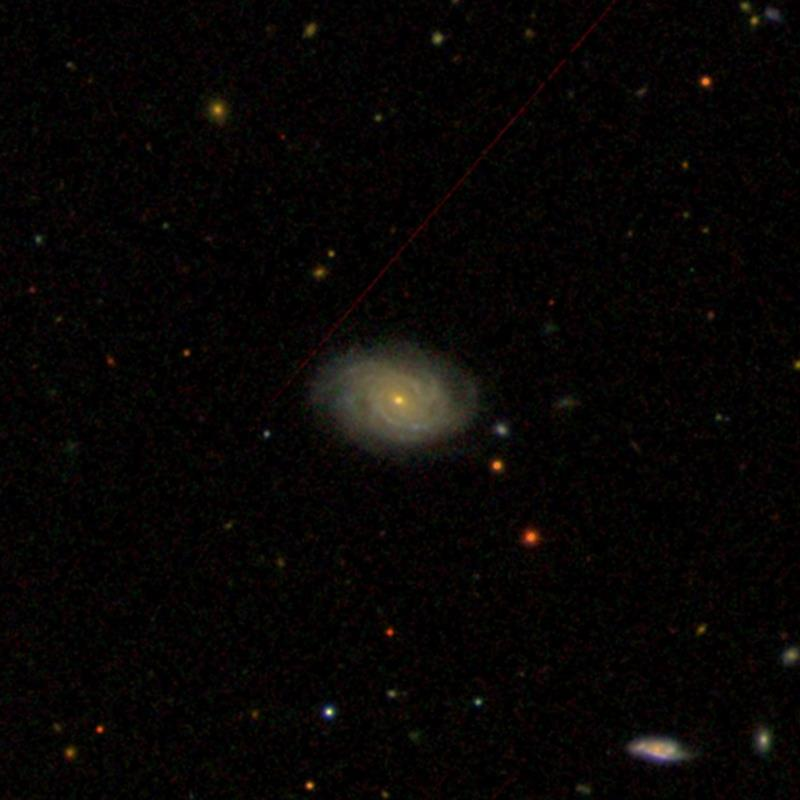
- NGC 725 (SDSS)

Observation data (J2000.0 epoch)
- Constellation: Cetus
- Right ascension: 01^{h} 52^{m} 35.49^{s}
- Declination: −16° 31′ 04.1″
- Redshift: 0.034647
- Heliocentric radial velocity: 10387 ± 7 km/s
- Distance: 450 Mly
- Apparent magnitude (V): 14.30
- Apparent magnitude (B): 15.00

Characteristics
- Type: Sc
- Apparent size (V): 0.7 x 0.6

Other designations
- PGC 6950, MCG -3-5-25

NGC 725 is a spiral galaxy approximately 450 million light-years away from Earth in the constellation of Cetus. It was discovered by Francis Preserved Leavenworth on November 9, 1885 with the 26" refractor at the Leander McCormick Observatory.

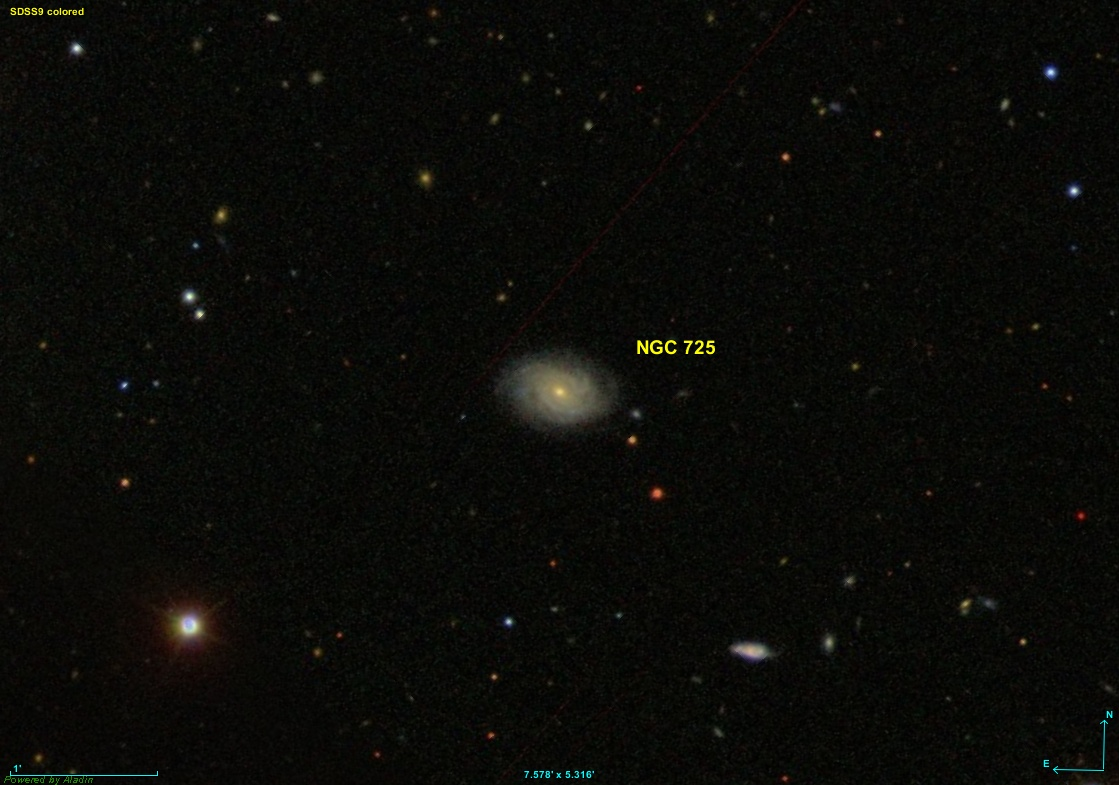
NGC 725 (SDSS)

== See also ==
- Spiral galaxy
- List of NGC objects (1–1000)
- Cetus (constellation)
