= NGC 369 =

Spiral galaxy in the constellation Cetus

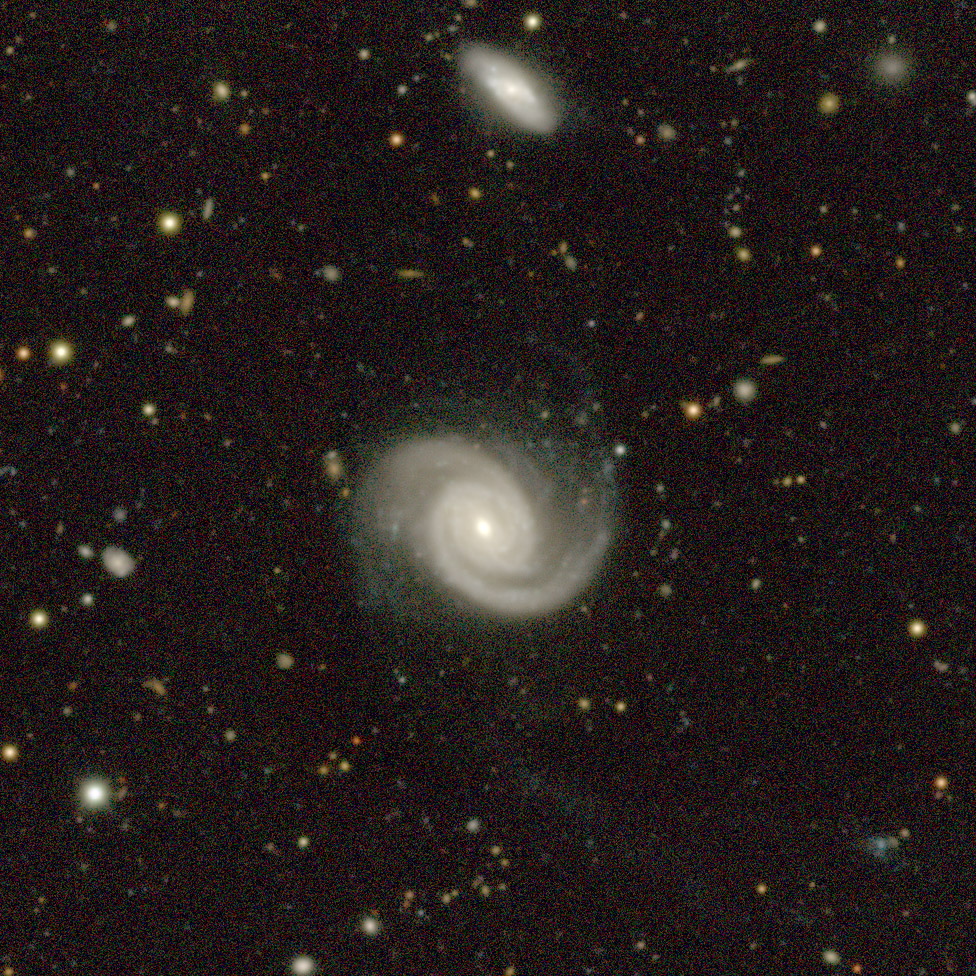
- DECam image of NGC 369

Observation data (J2000 epoch)
- Constellation: Cetus
- Right ascension: 01^{h} 05^{m} 08.9^{s}
- Declination: −17° 45′ 33″
- Redshift: 0.020808
- Heliocentric radial velocity: 6,238 km/s
- Apparent magnitude (V): 14.33

Characteristics
- Type: Sb
- Apparent size (V): 1.0' × 0.8'

Other designations
- ESO 541- G 017, MCG -03-03-022, 2MASX J01050889-1745331, IRAS F01027-1800, ESO-LV 5410170, PGC 3856.

NGC 369 is a spiral galaxy located in the constellation Cetus. It was discovered on October 9, 1885, by Francis Leavenworth. It was described by Dreyer as "very faint, very small, round, gradually brighter middle."
