= NGC 902 =

Spiral galaxy in the constellation Cetus

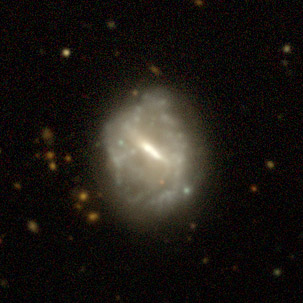
- DECam image of NGC 902

Observation data (J2000 epoch)
- Constellation: Cetus
- Right ascension: 02^{h} 22^{m} 21.749^{s}
- Declination: −16° 40′ 44.73″
- Redshift: 0.023437
- Heliocentric radial velocity: 6944 km/s
- Distance: 314.1 ± 22.0 Mly (96.31 ± 6.76 Mpc)
- Apparent magnitude (B): 14.82

Characteristics
- Type: SBbc

Other designations
- MCG -03-07-005, PGC 9021

NGC 902 is a barred spiral galaxy in the constellation Cetus. It is estimated to be 314 million light-years from the Milky Way and has a diameter of approximately 50,000 ly. NGC 902 was discovered on November 28, 1885 by Francis Leavenworth.

== See also ==
- List of NGC objects (1–1000)
