= NGC 1158 =

Galaxy in the constellation Eridanus

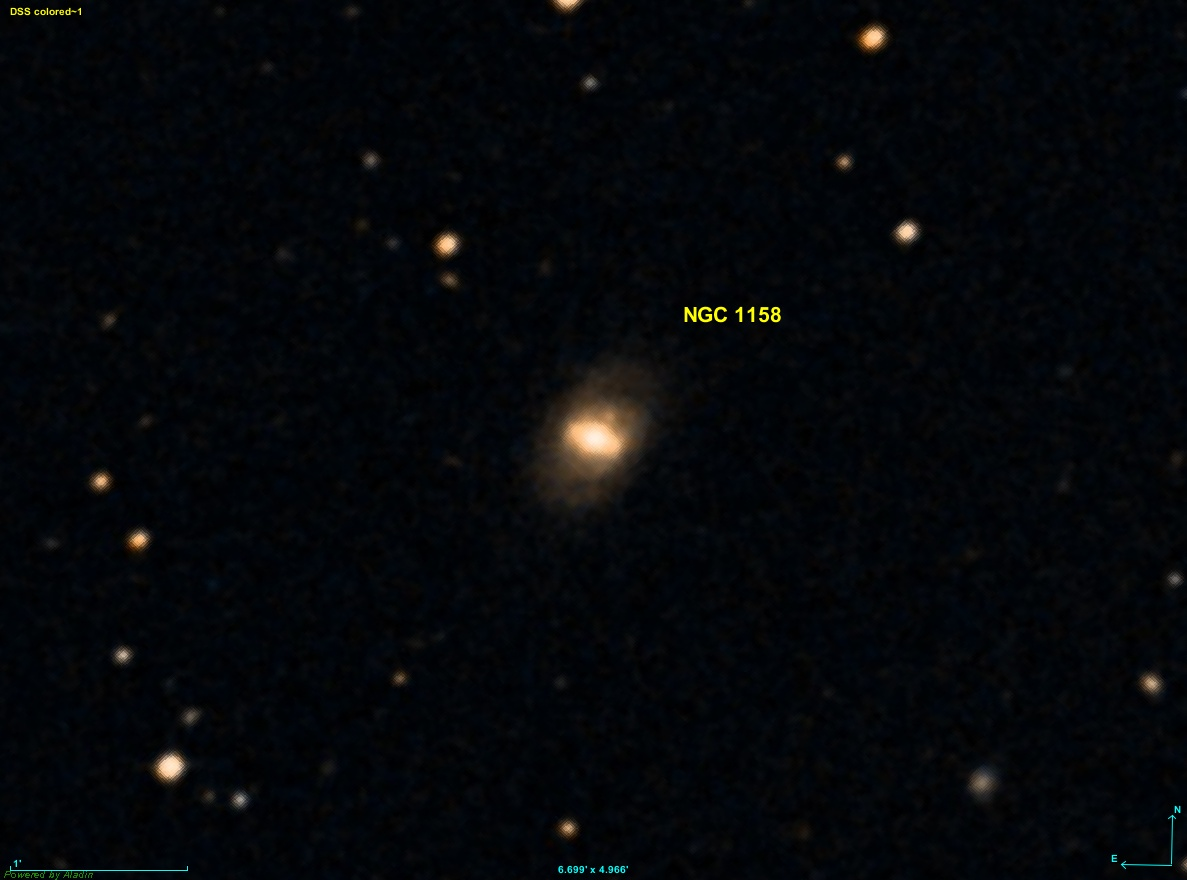

Observation data (J2000 epoch)
- Constellation: Eridanus
- Right ascension: 02h 57m 16.3s
- Declination: −14° 23′ 05″
- Redshift: 0.009870
- Apparent magnitude (V): 13.1

Characteristics
- Type: S0 (Lenticular)
- Apparent size (V): 1.4′ × 0.6′

NGC 1158 is a lenticular galaxy located in the constellation Eridanus. It was discovered by the American astronomer Francis Leavenworth on January 2, 1886. The galaxy lies approximately 133 million light-years away from Earth and has an apparent magnitude of 13.1 in the visual band.

NGC 1158 has a redshift of 0.009870, indicating that it is receding from Earth at a velocity of about 2960 km/s.
