= NGC 335 =

Spiral galaxy in the constellation Cetus

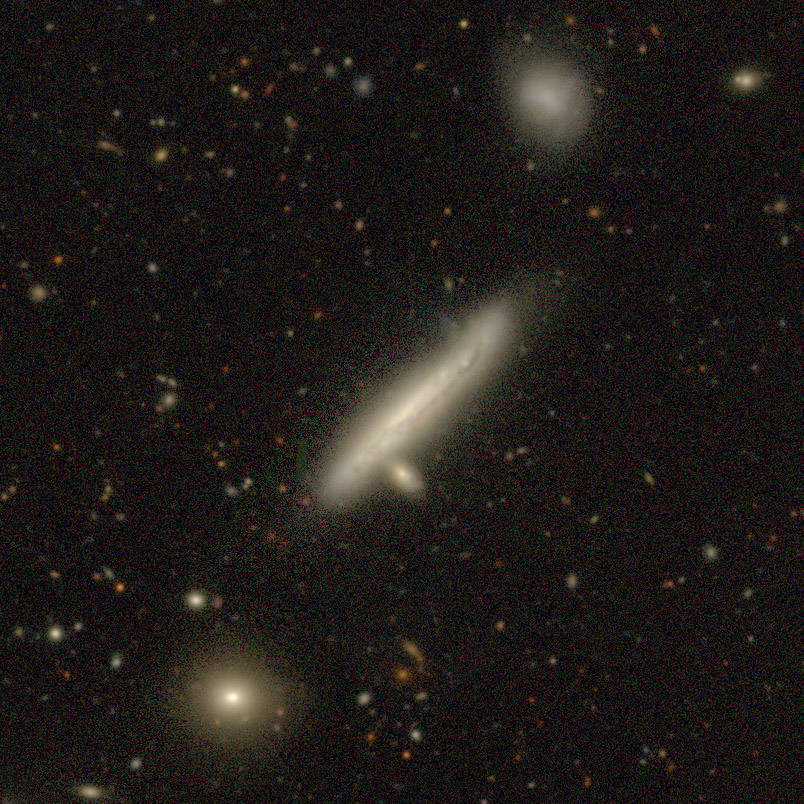
- NGC 335 with DECam. Smaller galaxy at the top is LEDA 871152 and smaller galaxy at the bottom is LEDA 870508.

Observation data (J2000 epoch)
- Constellation: Cetus
- Right ascension: 00^{h} 59^{m} 19.8^{s}
- Declination: −18° 14′ 05″
- Redshift: 0.019003
- Heliocentric radial velocity: 5,697 km/s
- Apparent magnitude (V): 15.38

Characteristics
- Type: Sbc
- Apparent size (V): 1.1' × 0.3'

Other designations
- ESO 541- G 006, MCG -03-03-015, 2MASX J00591978-1814045, 2MASXi J0059197-181404, IRAS 00568-1830, F00568-1830, ESO-LV 5410060, PGC 3544.

NGC 335 is a spiral galaxy in the constellation Cetus. It was discovered on October 9, 1885 by Francis Leavenworth. It was described by Dreyer as "very faint, pretty small, extended, brighter middle."

== Characteristics ==
NGC 335 is classified as an isolated field galaxy, meaning it does not belong to any known galaxy group or cluster, and moves independently through cosmic space.

== See also ==
- List of NGC objects (2001-3000)
- List of NGC objects
