= NGC 7759 =

Galaxy in the constellation Aquarius

Observation data (J2000 epoch)
- Constellation: Aquarius
- Right ascension: 23^{h} 48^{m} 54.712^{s}
- Declination: −16° 32′ 28.26″
- Redshift: 0.024743
- Heliocentric radial velocity: 7326 km/s
- Distance: 336.3 ± 23.6 Mly (103.10 ± 7.24 Mpc)
- Apparent magnitude (B): 13.95

Characteristics
- Type: SAB0^{0} pec:

Other designations
- MCG -03-60-018, PGC 72496

NGC 7759 is a lenticular galaxy in the constellation Aquarius. It is located about 340 million light-years (100 megaparsecs) away from the Sun. It was discovered independently by American astronomers Lewis A. Swift and Francis Preserved Leavenworth.
