= NGC 2890 =

Galaxy in the constellation Hydra

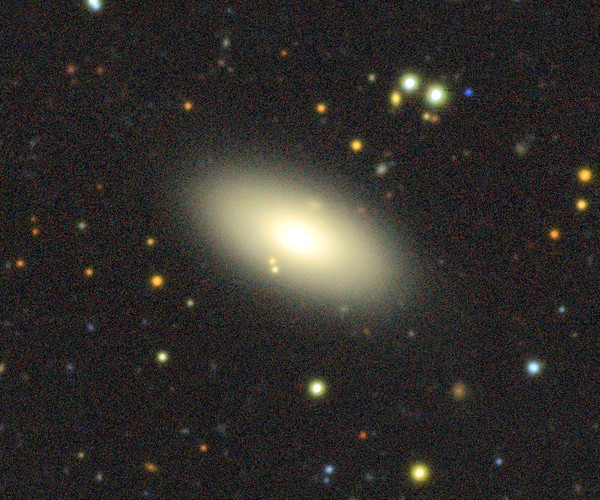
- NGC 2890 imaged by Legacy Surveys

Observation data (J2000 epoch)
- Constellation: Hydra
- Right ascension: 09^{h} 26^{m} 29.8289^{s}
- Declination: −14° 31′ 43.135″
- Redshift: 0.017092
- Heliocentric radial velocity: 5124 ± 29 km/s
- Distance: 262.4 ± 18.5 Mly (80.45 ± 5.67 Mpc)
- Apparent magnitude (V): 14.5

Characteristics
- Type: S0-:
- Size: ~79,700 ly (24.44 kpc) (estimated)
- Apparent size (V): 0.8′ × 0.5′

Other designations
- 2MASX J09262978-1431436, MCG -02-24-024, PGC 26778

NGC 2890 is a lenticular galaxy in the constellation of Hydra. Its velocity with respect to the cosmic microwave background is 5455 ± 37 km/s, which corresponds to a Hubble distance of 80.45 ± 5.67 Mpc (~263 million light-years). It was discovered by American astronomer Francis Leavenworth on 11 January 1886.

The SIMBAD database lists NGC 2890 as a Seyfert II Galaxy, i.e. it has a quasar-like nuclei with very high surface brightnesses whose spectra reveal strong, high-ionisation emission lines, but unlike quasars, the host galaxy is clearly detectable.

One supernova has been observed in NGC 2890: SN 2023xnl (Type Ia, mag 17.4931) was discovered by the Zwicky Transient Facility on 11 November 2023.

== See also ==
- List of NGC objects (2001–3000)
