= NGC 179 =

Galaxy in the constellation Cetus

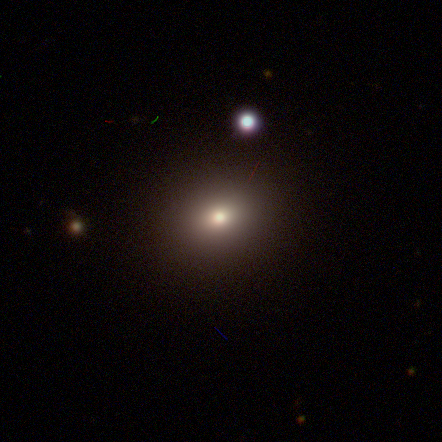
- NGC 179 with DECam.

Observation data (J2000 epoch)
- Constellation: Cetus
- Right ascension: 00^{h} 37^{m} 46.3^{s}
- Declination: −17° 50′ 58″
- Redshift: 0.019934
- Apparent magnitude (V): 14.30

Characteristics
- Type: SAB0^{−}
- Apparent size (V): 0.9' × 0.8'

Other designations
- ESO 540- G 007, MCG -03-02-026, 2MASX J00374629-1750578, 2MASXi J0037462-175058, ESO-LV 5400070, 6dF J0037462-175058, PGC 2241.

NGC 179 is a lenticular galaxy located 3.3 million light-years away in the constellation Cetus. It was discovered in 1886 by Francis Preserved Leavenworth.

== See also ==
- List of NGC objects (1–1000)
