= NGC 284 =

Galaxy in the constellation Cetus

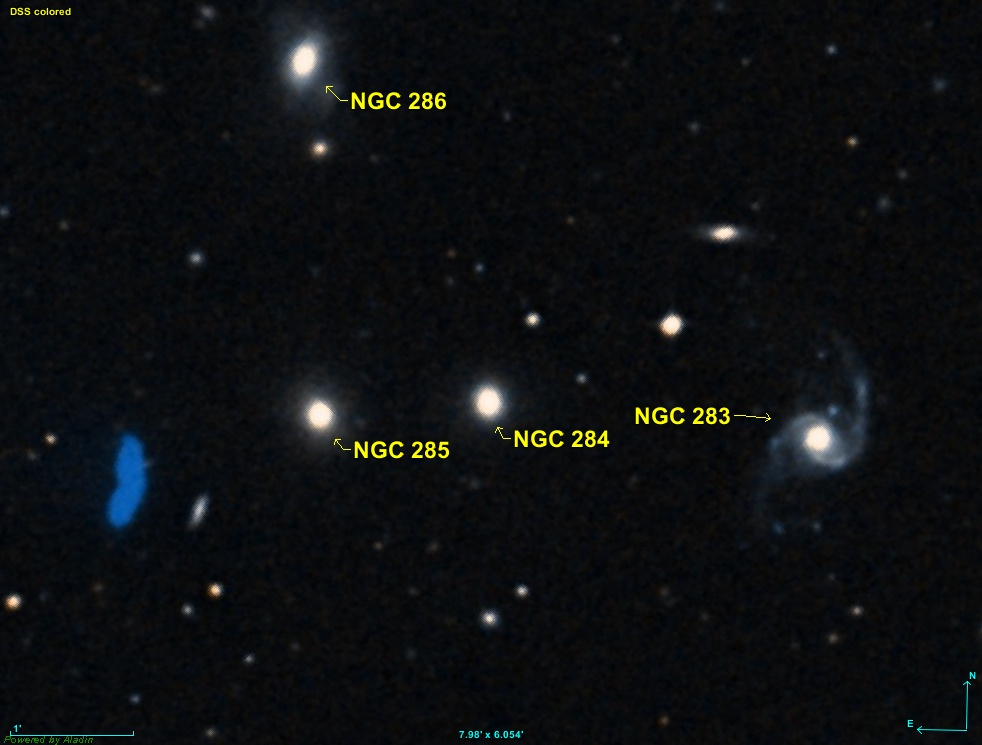
- NGC 284 as seen on DSS

Observation data (J2000 epoch)
- Constellation: Cetus
- Right ascension: 00^{h} 53^{m} 24.3^{s}
- Declination: −13° 09′ 32″
- Redshift: 0.038460
- Heliocentric radial velocity: 11,530 km/s
- Apparent magnitude (V): 15.41

Characteristics
- Type: E0-1
- Apparent size (V): 0.2' × 0.2'

Other designations
- MCG -02-03-032, 2MASX J00532423-1309321, PGC 3131.

NGC 284 is an elliptical galaxy in the constellation Cetus. It was discovered on October 2, 1886, by Francis Leavenworth.
