= NGC 3290 =

Large spiral galaxy in the constellation Hydra

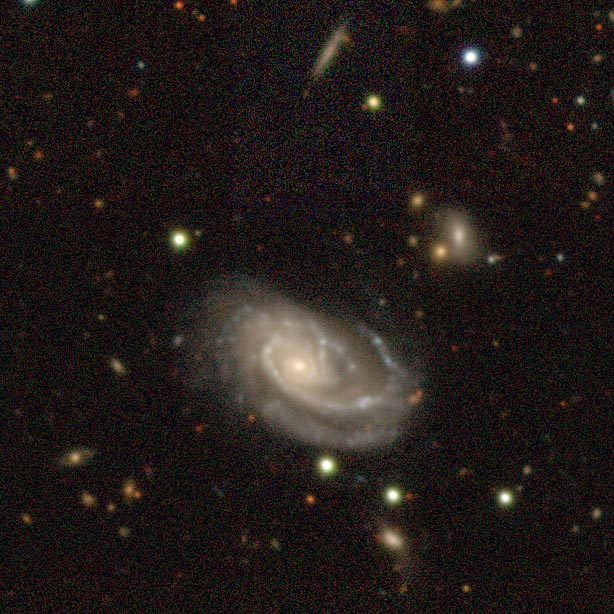
- The intermediate spiral galaxy NGC 3290, as seen by DECam

Observation data (J2000 epoch)
- Constellation: Hydra
- Right ascension: 10h 35m 17s
- Declination: -17° 16′ 36″
- Redshift: 0.035278
- Heliocentric radial velocity: 10,576 km/s
- Distance: 526 Mly (161 Mpc)
- Surface brightness: 22.79 mag/arcsec^2

Characteristics
- Type: SAbc

Other designations
- ARP 53, PGC 31346, PGC 31347, MCG -3-27-20, IRAS 10328-1701

NGC 3290 (also known as Arp 53) is a spiral galaxy located in the constellation Hydra. Its speed relative to the cosmic microwave background is 10,937 ± 27 km/s, which corresponds to a Hubble distance of 161 ± 11 Mpc (~525 million ly). NGC 3290 was discovered by American astronomer Francis Leavenworth in 1886.

NGC 3290 is cataloged in the Arp catalog as Arp 53. Halton Arp divided his catalog of unusual galaxies into groups based on purely morphological criteria. This galaxy belongs to the class of spiral galaxies with a small, high-surface-brightness companion on one arm.

The luminosity class of NGC 3280 is II-III and it has a broad HI line. It also contains regions of ionized hydrogen. Moreover, NGC 3290 has an apparent magnitude of 13.5.

== See also ==
- List of NGC objects (3001–4000)
- New General Catalogue
