= NGC 966 =

Galaxy in the constellation Cetus

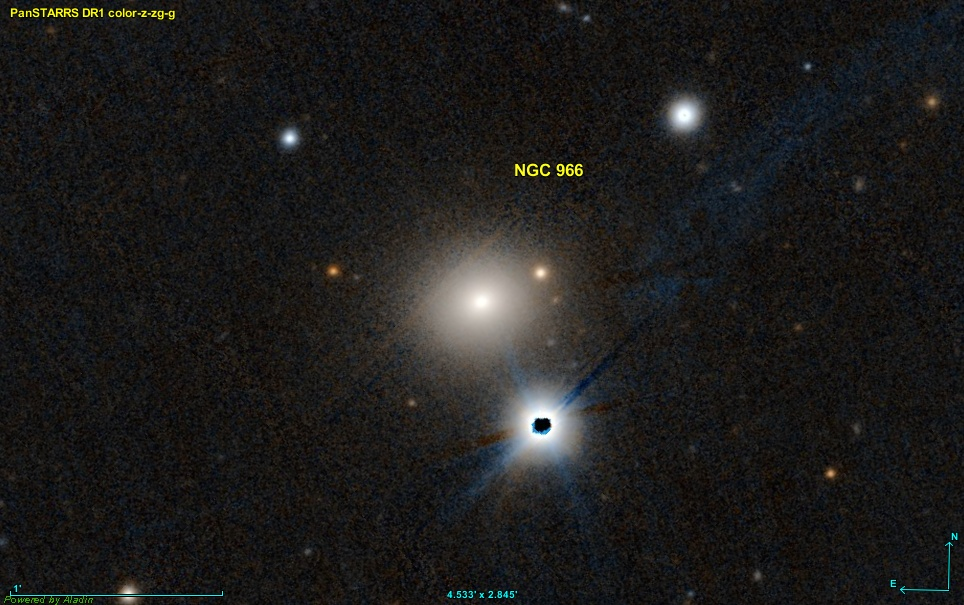
- Pan-STARRS image of NGC 966

Observation data (J2000.0 epoch)
- Constellation: Cetus
- Right ascension: 02^{h} 31^{m} 47.16^{s}
- Declination: −19° 52′ 54.10″
- Redshift: 0.033690
- Heliocentric radial velocity: 10100 ± 45 km/s
- Distance: 440 Mly
- Apparent magnitude (V): 13.30
- Apparent magnitude (B): 14.30

Characteristics
- Type: SA0^0 pec:
- Apparent size (V): 1.0 x 0.9

Other designations
- PGC 9626, MCG -3-7-29, ESO 545-30

NGC 966 is an unbarred lenticular galaxy approximately 440 million light-years away from Earth in the constellation of Cetus. It was discovered by American astronomer Francis Preserved Leavenworth in 1886.

== See also ==
- List of NGC objects (1–1000)
