= NGC 1155 =

Lenticular galaxy in the constellation Eridanus

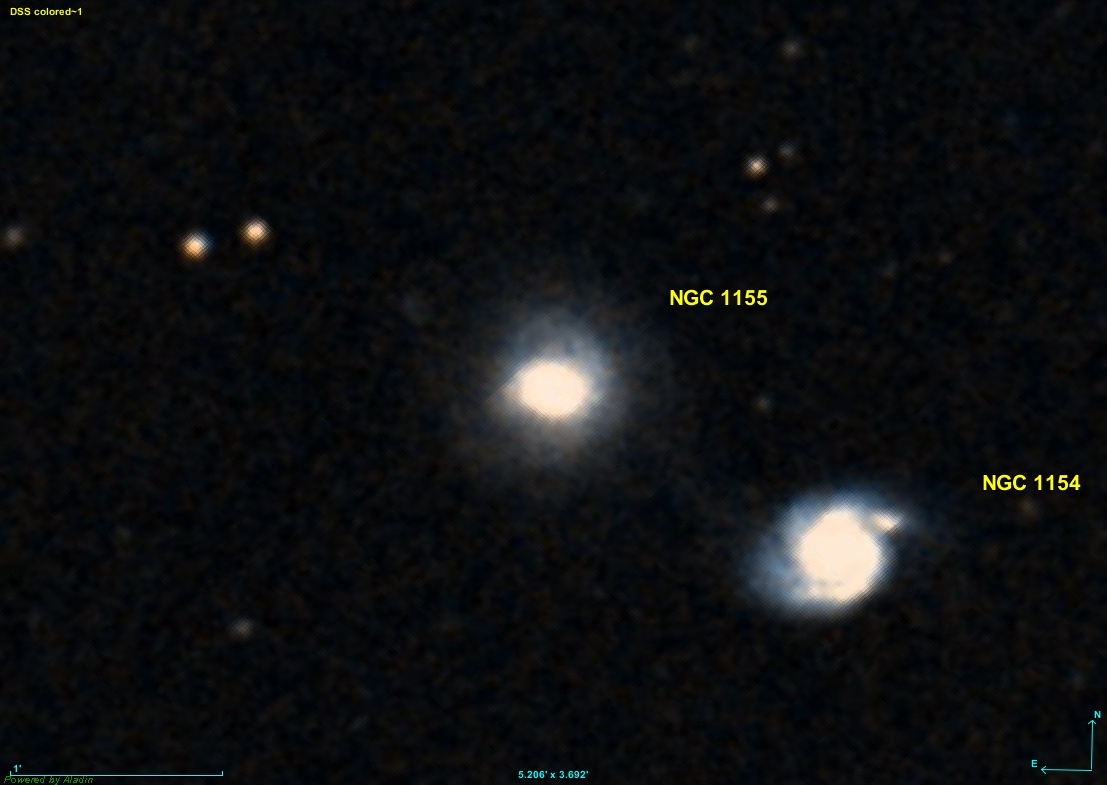

Observation data (J2000 epoch)
- Constellation: Eridanus
- Right ascension: 02h 58m 13.0s
- Declination: −10° 21′ 01″
- Redshift: 0.012
- Apparent magnitude (V): 13.4

Characteristics
- Type: S0
- Apparent size (V): 1.0′ × 0.8′

NGC 1155 is a lenticular galaxy located in the constellation Eridanus. It was discovered by Francis Leavenworth in 1886. The galaxy is classified as type S0 and has an apparent magnitude of 13.4.

== Observation ==
NGC 1155 can be observed in the southern sky, located at a right ascension of 02h 58m 13.0s and a declination of −10° 21′ 01″. It is part of the Eridanus constellation and is visible with moderate-sized telescopes due to its magnitude.
