= NGC 7828 =

Galaxy in the constellation Cetus

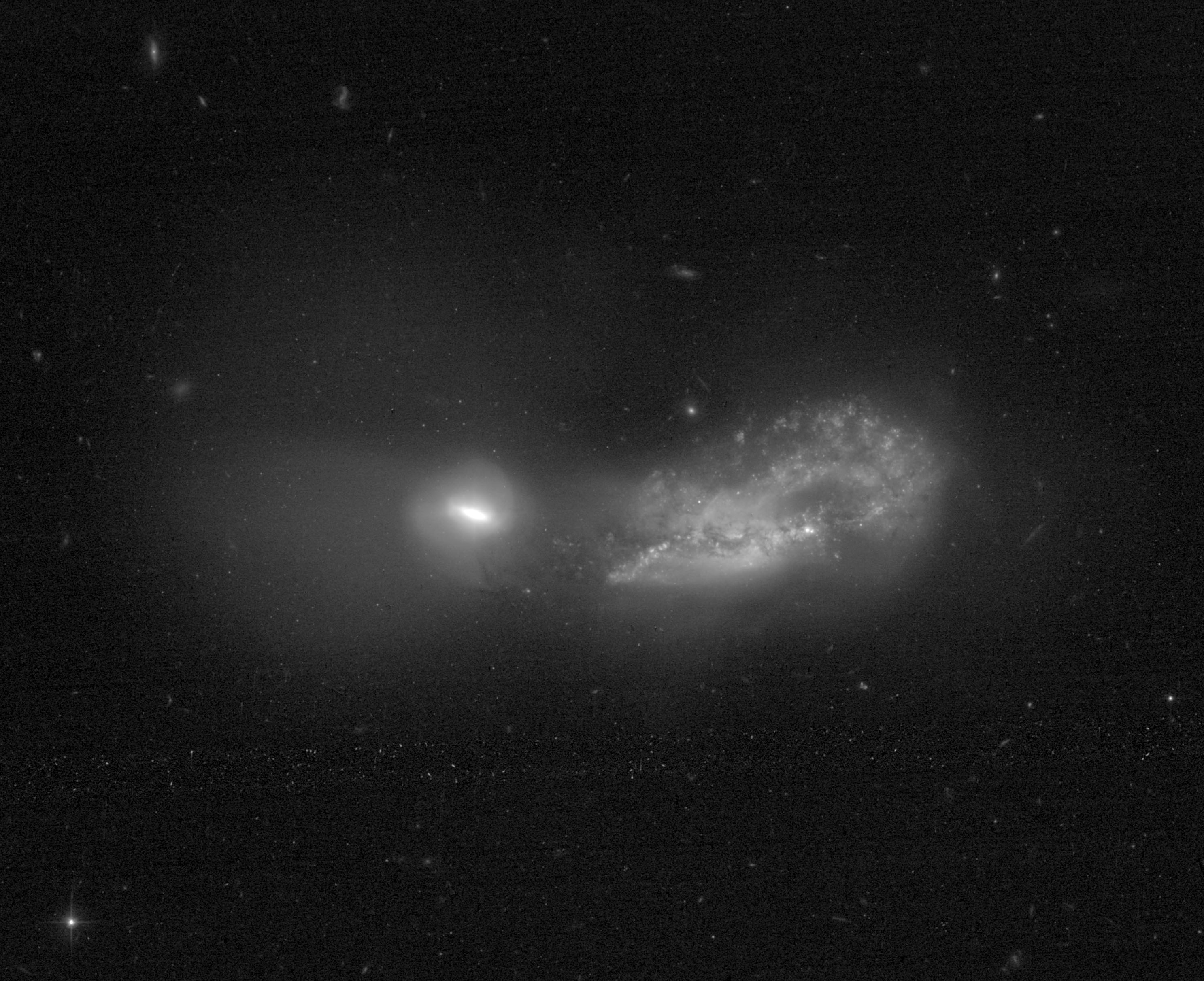
- NGC 7828 (right) by Hubble Space Telescope

Observation data (J2000 epoch)
- Constellation: Cetus
- Right ascension: 00^{h} 06^{m} 27.1^{s}
- Declination: −13° 24′ 58″
- Redshift: 0.019110 ± 0.000050
- Heliocentric radial velocity: 5,729 ± 15 km/s
- Distance: 294 ± 4.2 Mly (90.25 ± 1.3 Mpc)
- Apparent magnitude (V): 13.9

Characteristics
- Type: Im pec (Ring B)
- Apparent size (V): 0.9′ × 0.5′
- Notable features: Interacting galaxy

Other designations
- IRAS 00038-1341, Arp 144, MCG -02-01-025, PGC 483, VV 272a

NGC 7828 is a peculiar galaxy in the constellation Cetus. The galaxy lies about 300 million light years away from Earth, which means, given its apparent dimensions, that NGC 7828 is approximately 75,000 light years across. It was discovered by the American astronomer Francis Leavenworth in 1886. NGC 7828 forms a pair with its neighbor NGC 7829. The galaxy is included in Halton Arp's Atlas of Peculiar Galaxies in the elliptical galaxies emanating material category as Arp 144.

NGC 7828 is interacting with NGC 7829, lying about 30 arcseconds from its nucleus. The interaction of the two galaxies, which have similar mass, has led to the creation of an empty ring in NGC 7828. The nucleus of NGC 7828 is obscured in visual light, but it is more visible in the infrared. The ring appears to be partial in H-alpha. The star formation rate of the ring galaxy is estimated to be 6.86 M_{☉} per year. The two galaxies are surrounded by a neutral hydrogen gas cloud extending to the southeast for 6 arcminutes and 3 arcminutes to the west.

Two supernovae have been observed in NGC 7828, AT2018ewx and SN 2021ocs. SN 2021ocs was a Type Ic supernova discovered around maximum magnitude. Its spectrum was unusual, being dominated by oxygen and magnesium emission lines. It was discovered on May 30, 2021, by the ATLAS (Asteroid Terrestrial-impact Last Alert System) astronomical survey and had an apparent magnitude of 17.7.

== See also ==
- Interacting galaxy
- List of NGC objects (7001–7840)
- Lists of galaxies
