= NGC 1199 =

Galaxy in the constellation Eridanus

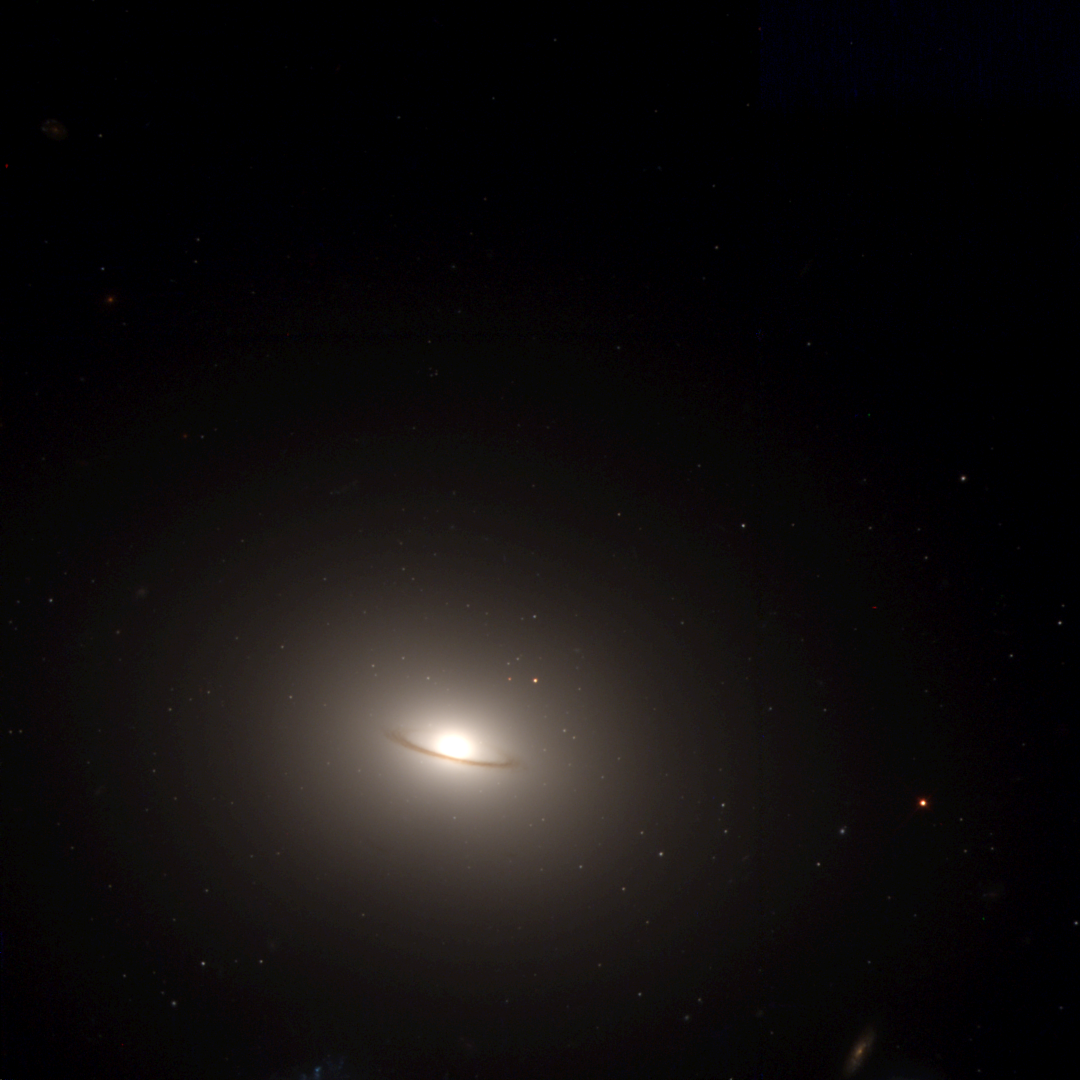
- NGC 1199 (NASA/ESA HST)

Observation data (J2000.0 epoch)
- Constellation: Eridanus
- Right ascension: 03^{h} 03^{m} 38.41^{s}
- Declination: −15° 36′ 47.50″
- Redshift: 0.008573
- Heliocentric radial velocity: 2570 ± 5 km/s
- Distance: 107 Mly
- Apparent magnitude (V): 11.40
- Apparent magnitude (B): 12.40

Characteristics
- Type: E3:
- Apparent size (V): 2.4 x 1.9

Other designations
- PGC 11527, MCG -3-8-67, HCG 22A

NGC 1199 is an elliptical galaxy approximately 107 million light-years away from Earth in the constellation of Eridanus. It was discovered by William Herschel on December 30, 1785.

NGC 1199 is dominated by stellar light with little long wavelength emission.

Together with NGC 1189, NGC 1190, NGC 1191 and NGC 1192 it forms Hickson Compact Group 22 (HCG 22) galaxy group. Although they are considered members of this group, NGC 1191 and NGC 1192 are in fact background objects, since they are much further away compared to the other members of this group.

== Image gallery ==
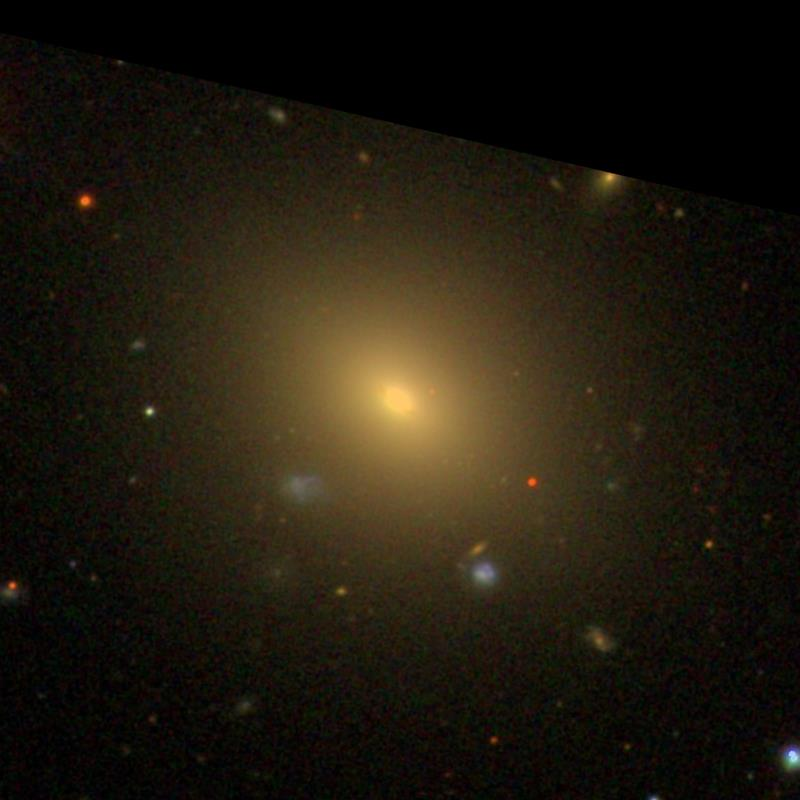
NGC 1199 (SDSS)

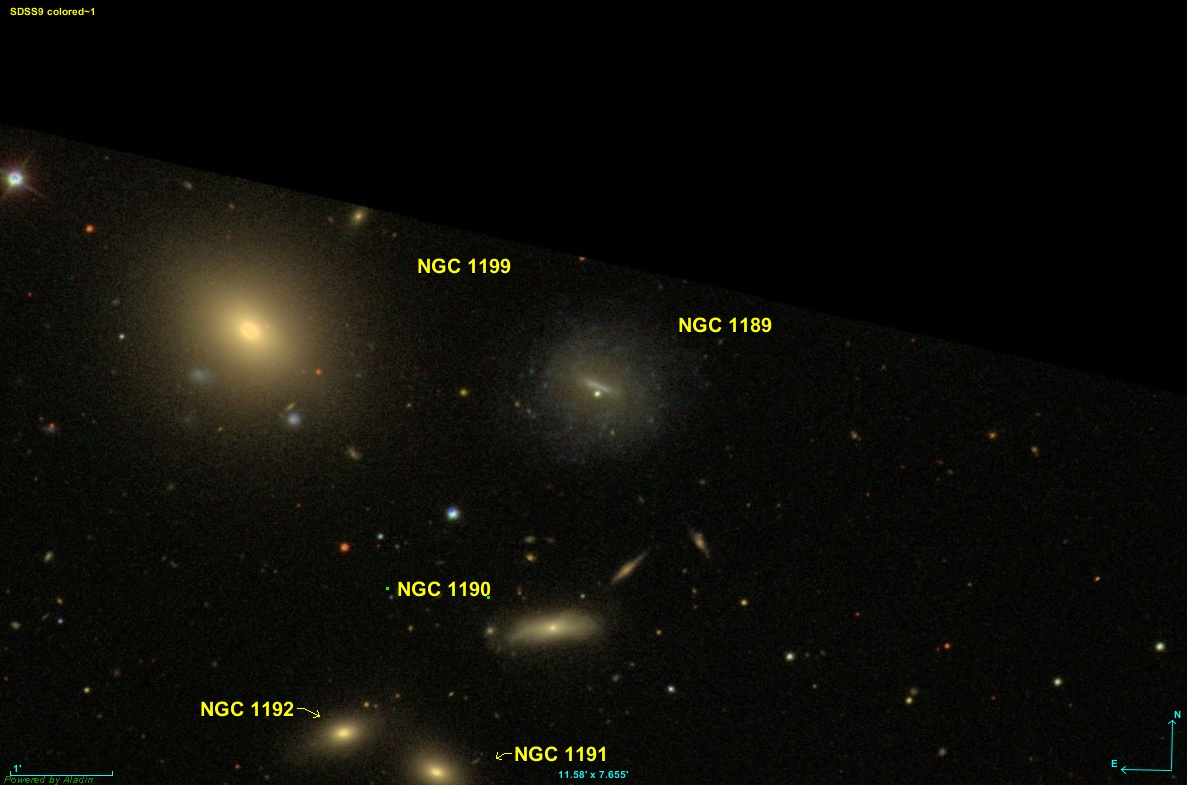
NGC 1199 with other members of the HCG 22 galaxy group (SDSS)

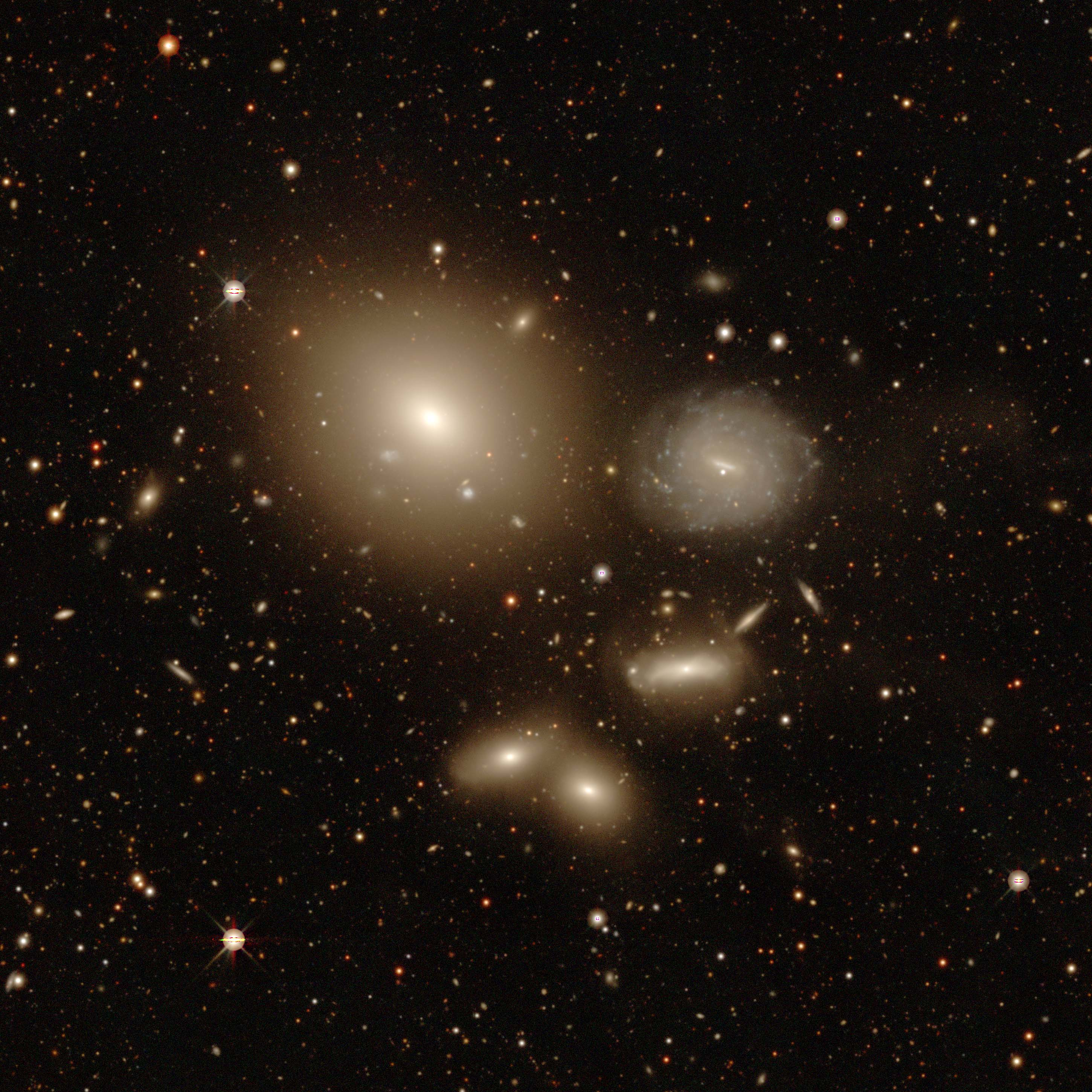
Complete view of HCG 22 with legacy surveys

== See also ==
- Lenticular galaxy
- Hickson Compact Group
- List of NGC objects (1001–2000)
- Eridanus (constellation)
