= NGC 7829 =

Galaxy in the constellation Cetus

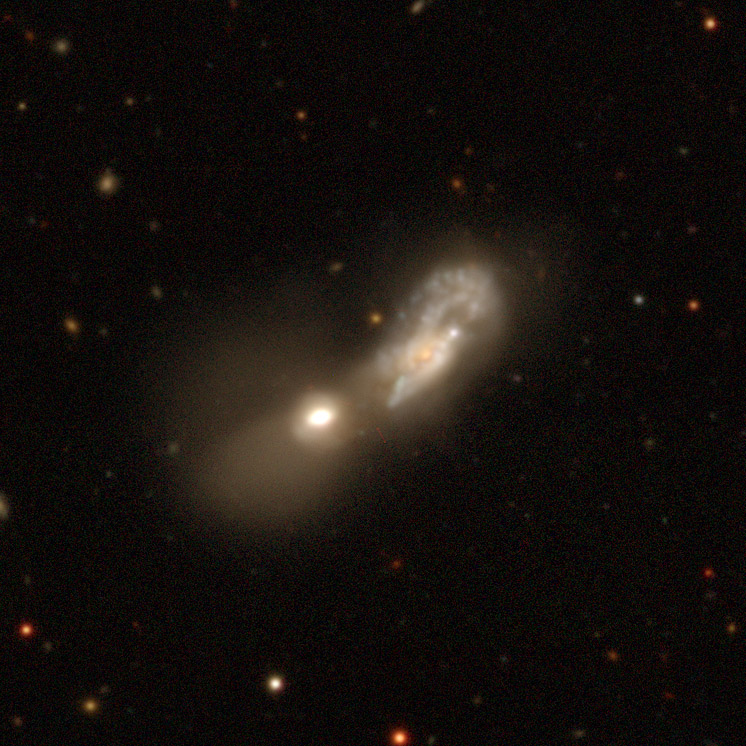

Observation data (J2000 epoch)
- Constellation: Cetus
- Right ascension: 00^{h} 06^{m} 28.9836^{s}
- Declination: −13° 25′ 14.256″
- Apparent magnitude (B): 15.07
- Surface brightness: 24.82 mag/arcsec2

Characteristics
- Type: S0 pec

Other designations
- 2MASX J00062900-1325140, PGC 488

NGC 7829 is a lenticular galaxy in the constellation Cetus. NGC 7829 was discovered by American astronomer Francis Leavenworth in 1886. NGC 7829 forms with its neighbor NGC 7828 a pair of gravitationally interacting galaxies. The pair appears in Halton Arp's Atlas of Peculiar Galaxies as Arp 144.

== See also ==
- Interacting galaxy
- List of NGC objects (7001–7840)
