= Francis Preserved Leavenworth =

American astronomer

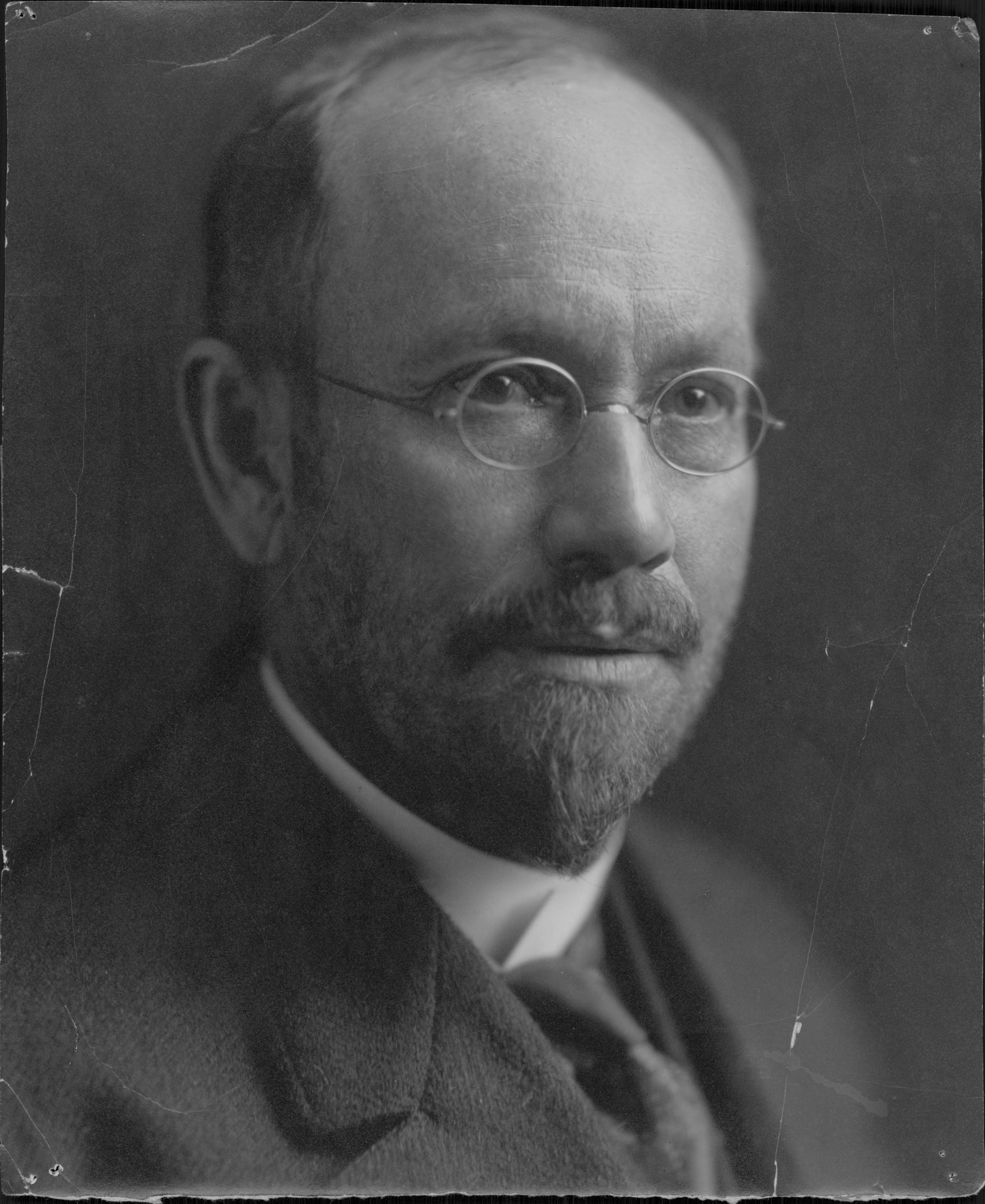
Francis P. Leavenworth

Francis Preserved Leavenworth (September 3, 1858 in Mount Vernon, Indiana – November 12, 1928; a.k.a. Frank Leavenworth) was an American astronomer. He discovered many New General Catalogue objects together with Frank Muller and Ormond Stone. They used a telescope with a 66-cm aperture at the Leander McCormick Observatory at the University of Virginia in Charlottesville, Virginia. He later became Professor of Astronomy at the University of Minnesota in 1892 and was given the title Professor Emeritus when he retired 35 years later.

He became a member of the Camden Astronomical Society shortly after its founding in 1888.

In 1909 he joined Frederick C. Leonard's Society for Practical Astronomy.

== See also ==
- New General Catalogue
- Observational astronomy
