= Béla Harkányi =

Hungarian astronomer, mathematician (1869–1932)

Béla Harkányi, Baron
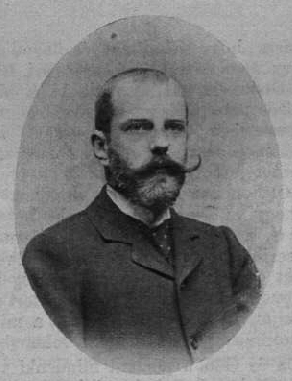
- Born: Béla Fülöp Harkányi; 11 April 1869; Pest, Hungary
- Died: 23 January 1932 (aged 62); Budapest, Hungary
- Education: Royal Hungarian University of Sciences; University of Leipzig; University of Strasbourg
- Known for: Determination of stellar temperatures
- Scientific career
- Fields: Astronomy
- Workplaces: Observatoire de Paris; Observatory of Potsdam; Konkoly Observatory; Royal Hungarian University of Sciences

Béla Harkányi (Baron) (Hungarian: [ˈbe:lɒ 'hɒrka:ɲi]; 11 April 1869 – 2 January 1932) was a Hungarian astrophysicist.

Harkányi was first to determine the temperatures (in 1902) and the diameters (in 1910) of individual stars other than the Sun.

== Biography ==
Harkányi was born in Budapest in a prosperous noble family. His parents were Károly Harkányi and monostori Emilia Vörös. From 1895 the family held the title of Baron.

After finishing secondary school and three years of undergraduate studies in Budapest, Béla Harkányi went on to study one year in Leipzig, then in Strasbourg (teachers: F. Kohlrausch, E. Cohn, H. Kobold), occasionally visiting major astronomical institutes in Germany and the United States, including Lick Observatory. He obtained his PhD in 1896 at the Royal Hungarian University of Sciences in Budapest.

Next he spent two years at the Observatory of Paris with postgraduate studies, attending, among others, Poincaré's university lectures. In the first half of 1899 he worked in the Observatory of Potsdam under J. F. Hartmann, following which he started work in the astronomical observatory of Miklós Konkoly-Thege in Ógyalla. Here he conducted observational photometry while he also developed an interest in theoretical astrophysics, under the influence of his friend and associate, Radó Kövesligethy. He also collaborated with Loránd Eötvös in the gravivariometric experiments in 1901.

In 1903 he left Ógyalla and moved back to Budapest, where from 1907 he became Privatdozent in the Institute for Cosmography and Geophysics of the university, led by Radó Kövesligethy. In 1911 he was elected a corresponding member of the Hungarian Academy of Sciences.

In the political upheaval following Austria-Hungary's 1918 military collapse, Harkányi was briefly nominated to be full professor during the short-lived communist dictatorship of 1919. In the aftermath, however, this promotion was declared void together with all other measures introduced by the communist regime. Together with Harkányi's non-pushy character and his financial self-reliance, this episode may have played a role in that, despite his achievements, Harkányi was never appointed to a university chair.

Contemporaries describe Harkányi as a reclusive personality with an extensive, encyclopaedic knowledge and a strong critical streak.

== Scientific achievements ==
Harkányi's most outstanding result was the first determination of the surface temperature for individual stars other than the Sun. Prior to 1902, when his relevant study was published, data only existed for the Sun's effective temperature. The range of temperatures of other stars had very roughly been bracketed by Scheiner in 1894. Harkányi realized that the recent success in determining the form of blackbody spectrum offered a way to determine stellar temperatures by fitting the blackbody curve to spectrophotometric observations of stars to determine the location of the maximum of the blackbody curve, from which the temperature follows applying Wien's displacement law. It is notable that this method works even if the maximum is outside the spectral range of observations. Using Vogel's (1880) spectrophotometric data, available at 7 or 8 wavelength values, Harkányi performed the fit and obtained Wien temperatures for 5 stars (Sirius, Vega, Arcturus, Aldebaran, and Betelgeuze). The values obtained tend to be on the low side by 500/2500 K for late/early type stars, respectively. Sources of the error include errors in the observational data; application of the Wien approximation instead of the full Planck blackbody spectrum; and a very rough extinction correction. Nevertheless, it took decades until the temperatures of these stars could be nailed down with significantly better precision.

In 1910 he further developed an earlier result by R. Kövesligethy, deriving the relation between colour temperature and surface brightness of a star in the visual domain. Comparing this value with the absolute magnitudes of stars with known parallax, he was able to derive estimates for the physical sizes and apparent angular diameters of 17 stars for the first time.

Harkányi was also involved in photometric studies of variable stars and empirical studies of the relation between stellar temperatures, spectral types and absolute magnitudes. He also pointed out the existence of stars below the main sequence of the Hertzsprung-Russell diagram, later known as subdwarfs.

== List of Harkányi's main publications ==
Independent research papers:

- Harkányi B.: A sarkmagasság ingadozása. Die Bestimmung und die Theorie Polhöhenschwankungen. Budapest (1896)
- Harkányi B.: A Nova Persei (3.1901) photometrikus megfigyelése. Ógyallai Kis. Kiadv. 1. (1901)
- Harkányi B., A Nova (3.1901) Persei photometriai megfigyelése az Ó-Gyallai observatoriumon. Mat. Term. Ért. 19, 374-393 (1901)
- Harkányi B.: Beobachtungen der Nova (3. 1901) Persei. Astr. Nachr. 155, 155 (1901)
- Harkányi B.: Photometrische Beobachtungen der Nova (3.1901) Persei. Astr. Nachr. 156, 79 (1901)
- Harkányi B.: Über die Temperaturbestimmung der Fixsterne auf spectralphotometrischem Wege. Astr. Nachr. 158, 17 (1902)
- Harkányi B., Über die Flächenhelligkeit, photometrische Größe und Temperatur der Sterne Astr. Nachr. 185, 33 (1910)
- Harkányi B., Darstellung der photometrischen und photographischen Größe als Funktion der Temperatur der Sterne Astr. Nachr. 186, 161 (1910)
- Harkányi B.: Adalékok a csillagok fejlõdésének elméletéhez (székfoglaló). Mat. Term. Ért. 39, 30-47 (1922)
- Harkányi B.: Über den Einfluß der absoluten Größe auf die effektive Temperatur der Sterne. Astr. Nachr. 217, 365 (1923)
- Harkányi B.: Über die Kapteynschen Parallaxenformeln. Astr. Nachr. 223, 135 (1925)

PhD thesis:

- Harkányi B.: A sarkmagasság-változások meghatározása és elméleti magyarázata. Dokt. ért., Budapest (1896)

Descriptive and popular astronomy articles:

- Harkányi B.: Az észak-amerikai observatóriumokról. Math. Phys. Lapok 3, 139 (1894)
- Harkányi B.: Az égitestek hőmérsékletének meghatározása. Math. Phys. Lapok 12, 256-274 (1903)
- Harkányi B.: Az anomal dispersio szerepe az asztrofizikában. Math. Phys. Lapok 13, 143-155 (1904)
- Harkányi B.: A forgási ellipsoid meridián-hosszának minimumáról állandó térfogat mellett. Math. Phys. Lapok 20, 163-168 (1911)
- Harkányi B.: A fénysebesség változásának szerepe asztronómiai jelenségeknél. Math. Phys. Lapok 23, 33-38 (1914)
- Harkányi B.: A napfoltok mágneses polaritásának törvényeirõl. Stella 1, 21-25 (1926)
- Harkányi B.: (Rövid hírek.). Stella 2, 14-27 (1927)
- Harkányi B.: (Könyvismertetés.). Stella 2, 70-71 (1927)

Other papers:

- Harkányi B.: Megemlékezés Gothard Jenőről. TTud. Közl. 1, 839-845 (1909)
- Harkányi B.: Eugene V. Gothard. Astrophys. J. 31, 1 (1910)
