= NGC 3748 =

Galaxy in the constellation Leo

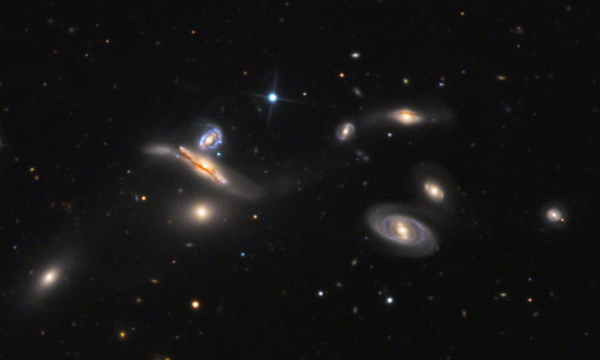
- NGC 3748 is located on the top right of the image above NGC 3745 and NGC 3746 which was taken by Mount Lemmon Observatory

Observation data (J2000 epoch)
- Constellation: Leo
- Right ascension: 11h 37m 49.065s
- Declination: +22d 01m 34.14s
- Redshift: 0.029407
- Heliocentric radial velocity: 8,816 km/s
- Distance: 440 Mly (135 Mpc)
- Group or cluster: Copeland Septet
- Apparent magnitude (V): 14.8

Characteristics
- Type: SB0?, S0, RET
- Size: 148,000 ly

Other designations
- PGC 36007, CGCG 127-007, MCG +04-28-007, Copeland Septet NED03, 2MASX J11374903+2201340, NSA 139941, HCG 057E, SDSS J113749.06+2201134.1, WBL 343-002, UZC J113749.1+220134, SSTSL2 J113749.06+220134.2, 2XMM J113749.0+220133, LEDA 36007

NGC 3748 is a lenticular galaxy with a bar located in the constellation Leo. It is located 440 million light-years away from the Solar System and was discovered by Ralph Copeland on April 5, 1874, but also observed by Hermann Kobold, Lawrence Parsons and John Louis Emil Dreyer.

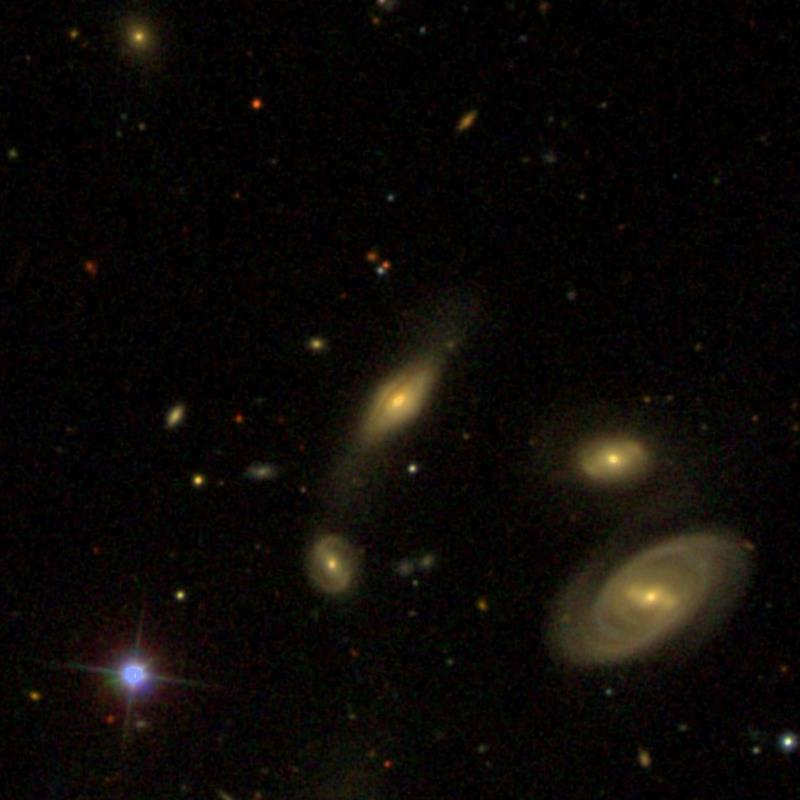
Sloan Digital Sky Survey image of NGC 3748 next to two members of the Copeland Septet.

Like NGC 3746, NGC 3748 also has a recessed core (RET). It is described as, "moderately bright, fairly small, slightly elongated NW-SE, 0.4'x0.3' with a small bright core".

== Copeland Septet ==
NGC 3748 is a member of the Copeland Septet which is made up of 7 galaxies which were discovered by Copeland in 1874. The other members are NGC 3745, NGC 3746, NGC 3750, NGC 3751, NGC 3753 and NGC 3754.

Halton Arp noticed the galaxies in this group in an article that was published in 1966. This group is known as Arp 320 along with another galaxy, PGC 36010.

This group was observed by Paul Hickson whom he included in his article in 1982. The group is known as Hickson 57, in which NGC 3748 is designated as HCG 57E.
