= NGC 3745 =

Galaxy in the constellation Leo

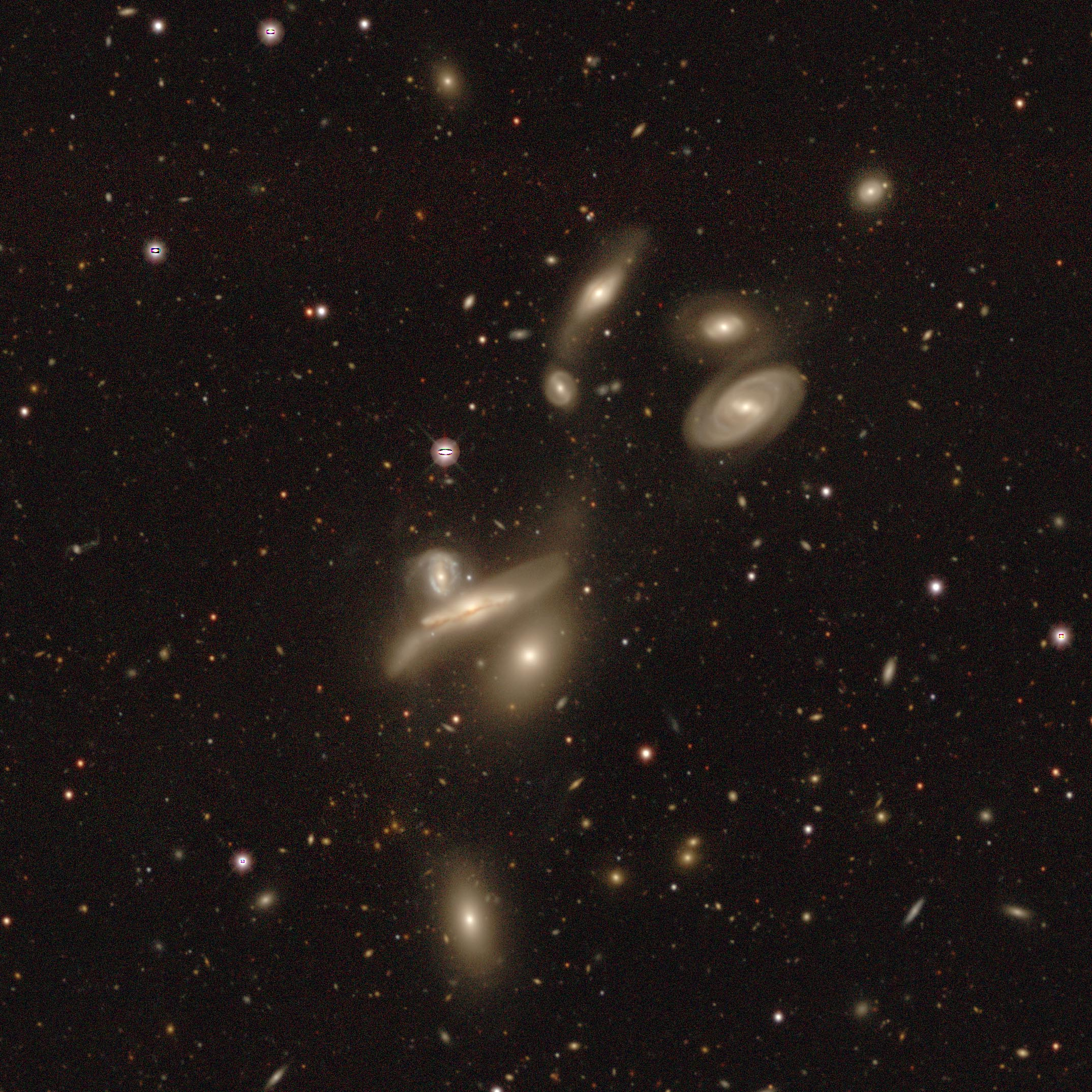
- DECam image of NGC 3745 and the members of the Copeland Septet

Observation data (J2000 epoch)
- Constellation: Leo
- Right ascension: 11h 37m 44.434s
- Declination: +22d 01m 16.64s
- Redshift: 0.031577
- Heliocentric radial velocity: 9,467 km/s
- Distance: 471 Mly (144.4 Mpc)
- Group or cluster: Copeland Septet
- Apparent magnitude (V): 15.2

Characteristics
- Type: SB(s)0, E-S0
- Size: 74,500 ly

Other designations
- PGC 36001, MCG +04-28-004, Copeland Septet NED01, 2MASX J11374443+2201170, SDSS J113744.43+220116.5, HCG 057G, NSA 112840, SSTSL2 J113744.44+220116.6, LEDA 36001

NGC 3745 is a lenticular galaxy with a bar structure located in the constellation of Leo. NGC 3745 is located 471 million light-years away from the Solar System and was discovered by Ralph Copeland on April 5, 1874, but also observed by Hermann Kobold, Lawrence Parsons and John Louis Emil Dreyer.

== Copeland Septet ==
NGC 3745 is a member of the Copeland Septet. The other members of the group are NGC 3746, NGC 3748, NGC 3750, NGC 3751, NGC 3753 and NGC 3754.

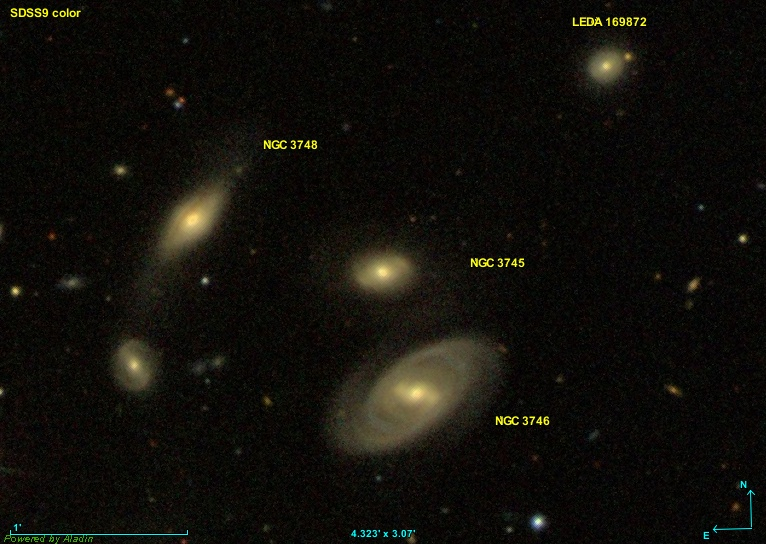
Sloan Digital Sky Survey image of NGC 3745 which is located above NGC 3746.

Halton Arp noticed the group when he published the article in 1966. The group is designated as Arp 320 in which another galaxy PGC 36010, is part of it.

This group was also observed by Paul Hickson, in which he included them inside his article in 1982. This group is known as Hickson 57, in which NGC 3745 is designated as HCG 57G.
