= NGC 3746 =

Galaxy in the constellation Leo

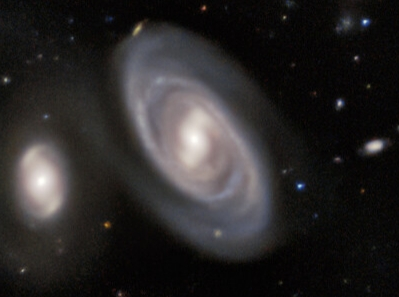
- NGC 3746 (center) with NGC 3745 (left), imaged by Kitt Peak National Observatory

Observation data (J2000 epoch)
- Constellation: Leo
- Right ascension: 11^{h} 37^{m} 43.6312^{s}
- Declination: +22° 00′ 35.153″
- Redshift: 0.030072
- Heliocentric radial velocity: 9,015 ± 2 km/s
- Distance: 449.2 ± 31.5 Mly (137.72 ± 9.65 Mpc)
- Group or cluster: Copeland Septet
- Apparent magnitude (V): 15.01

Characteristics
- Type: SB(r)b
- Size: ~44,400 ly (13.62 kpc) (estimated)
- Apparent size (V): 1.1′ × 0.5′

Other designations
- Copeland Septet NED02, HCG 057B, 2MASS J11374363+2200353, 2MASX J11374364+2200349, UGC 6597, LEDA 35997, MCG +04-28-005, PGC 35997, CGCG 127-006, SDSS J113743.62+220035.3

NGC 3746 is a large barred spiral galaxy with a ring structure located in the constellation Leo. It is located 449 million light-years from the Solar System and has an approximate diameter of 45,000 light-years. NGC 3746 was discovered by Ralph Copeland on 9 February 1874 with subsequent observations made by Hermann Kobold, Lawrence Parsons and John Louis Emil Dreyer.

The luminosity class of NGC 3746 is II and it has a broad H II region with a recessed core (RET).

== Copeland Septet ==
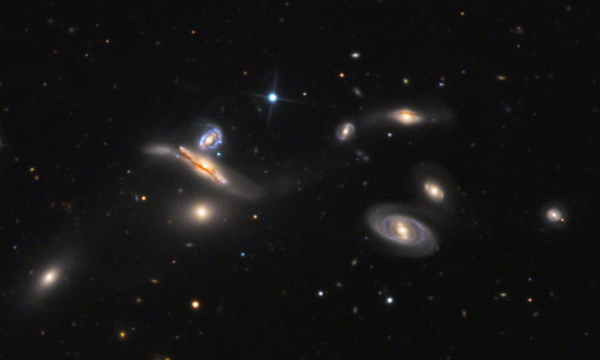
Copeland Septet with NGC 3746 in bottom right, imaged by Mount Lemmon Observatory

NGC 3746 is a member of the Copeland Septet which comprises 7 galaxies discovered by Copeland in 1874. The other 6 members are NGC 3745, NGC 3748, NGC 3750, NGC 3751, NGC 3753, and NGC 3754. Together, they are known as Hickson 57 and Arp 320.

== Supernovae ==
Two supernovae have been discovered in NGC 3746:

- SN 2002ar (Type Ia, mag. 16.5) was discovered by Dr W. D. Li from the University of California, Berkeley via unfiltered CCD images which was taken by the 0.8-m Katzman Automatic Imagining Telescope on 3 and 4 February 2002. It was located 3".3 east and 0".5 south of the nucleus.
- SN 2005ba (Type II, mag. 17.5) was discovered on 1 April 2005 by Norwegian scientists Arne Danielsen, Mikkel Steine, and Stale Kildahl via unfiltered images taken from a 'Celestron 14' reflector at Veggli, Norway. It was located 14".6 west and 4".0 north of the nucleus.
