= Golden Pheasant =

Golden Pheasant may refer to:

- Golden pheasant, also known as the Chinese pheasant, species of gamebird from China
- Golden Pheasant (beer), Slovak beer
- Golden Pheasant (horse), racehorse
- Golden Pheasant Award, the highest award given by the Scout Association of Japan
- Operation Golden Pheasant, 1988 U.S. military operation in Honduras against the Sandinistas
