= Croatian Tales of Long Ago =

1916 short story collection by Ivana Brlić-Mažuranić

- Cover of the 1924 London edition
- Author: Ivana Brlić-Mažuranić
- Original title: Priče iz davnine
- Translator: F.S. Copeland
- Illustrator: Vladimir Kirin
- Language: Croatian
- Genre: Children's short story collection
- Publisher: Matica hrvatska
- Publication date: 1916
- Publication place: Croatia
- English publication date: 1922 (New York); 1924 (London)
- Media type: Print (hardcover)
- Pages: 258 pp (New York edition)

Croatian Tales of Long Ago (Croatian: Priče iz davnine lit. "Stories from Ancient Times"), is a short story collection written by the acclaimed children's author Ivana Brlić-Mažuranić (sometimes spelled as "Ivana Berlić-Mažuranić" in English), originally published in 1916 in Zagreb by the Matica hrvatska publishing house. The collection is considered her masterpiece and it features a series of newly written fairy tales heavily inspired by motifs taken from ancient Slavic mythology of pre-Christian Croatia.

Croatian Tales of Long Ago are seen as one of the most typical examples of her writing style which has been compared by literary critics to Hans Christian Andersen and J. R. R. Tolkien due to the way it combines original fantasy plots with folk mythology.

The collection was translated into English by F.S. Copeland and first published in New York in 1922 by the Frederick A. Stokes Co. and in 1924 in London by the George Allen & Unwin publishing house, the same company which originally published J.R.R. Tolkien's The Hobbit in 1937, and The Lord of the Rings trilogy in 1954–55. The English-language editions also featured illustrations by the Croatian illustrator Vladimir Kirin.

== Overview ==
The original Croatian edition published in 1916 consisted of six stories. Two additional stories were later added and first published in the Croatian 1926 edition. These eight appear in contemporary Croatian editions. Since the English translation was published before the extra two stories were written, they featured only the original six tales. The following is the list of original titles followed by English titles as translated by Copeland (stories missing from the English version are marked with the † symbol):

- Kako je Potjeh tražio istinu (How Quest Sought the Truth)
- Ribar Palunko i njegova žena (Fisherman Plunk and His Wife)
- Regoč (Reygoch)
- Šuma Striborova (Stribor's Forest)
- Bratac Jaglenac i sestrica Rutvica (Little Brother Primrose and Sister Lavender)
- Lutonjica Toporko i devet župančića †
- Sunce djever i Neva Nevičica (Bridesman Sun and Bride Bridekins)
- Jagor †

Between 2002 and 2006, the eight stories from the collection were adapted into a series of animated cartoons and interactive games made by an international team of animators from eight countries, led by Helena Bulaja. The project won numerous awards at various new media and animation festivals. The cartoons were produced in Croatian, English and German and published in CD-ROM format, and are available for viewing online.

== List of translations ==
Language	Year	Translator	Title (Location)
English	1922	F.S. Copeland	Croatian Tales of Long Ago (New York)
English	1924	F.S. Copeland	Croatian Tales of Long Ago (London)
Swedish	1928		Lavendel och Rosmarin (Stockholm)
Czech	1928	Jan Hudec	Pohádky z dávných dob (Prague)
Danish	1929		Lavendel og Rosmarin (Copenhagen)
Russian	1930		Skazki davnjago vremeni (Zagreb) (Рассказы из древности)
German	1931		Aus Urväterzeiten (Zagreb)
German	1933		Aus Urväterzeiten (Salzburg)
Slovak	1931		Povesti iz pradávna
Slovene	1950		Zgodbine iz davnine (Zagreb)
Slovene	1955		Pripovedke iz davnine (Ljubljana)
Slovene	1962		Zgodbe iz davnine (Zagreb)
Macedonian	1956		Prikazni od staro vreme (Skopje)
Macedonian	1957		Pripovedke iz davnine (Toronto)
Italian	1957	Franjo Trogrančić	Racconti e leggende della Croazia (Torino)
Albanian	1957		Tregime te lashtesis (Priština)
Hungarian	1965		Rég mült idök meséi (Novi Sad)
Ukrainian	1965		Kazky z davnyny (Kiev)
Latvian	2010		Horvātu stāsti no senatnes (Rīga)
Lithuanian	1975	Loreta Vasil- Mazuronytė	Chorvatų sakmės (Vilnius)
Japanese	2010	Shigeo Kurihara	Mukashimukashi no mukashi kara (Kyoto) (昔々の昔から)
Turkish	2023	Nadiya Tankut	Eski Zaman Öyküleri (Ankara)
