= NGC 3754 =

Galaxy in the constellation Leo

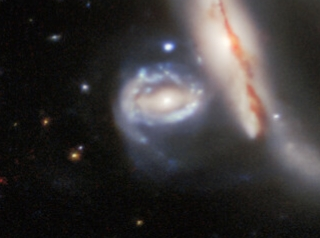
- NGC 3754

Observation data (J2000 epoch)
- Constellation: Leo
- Right ascension: 11h 37m 54.921s
- Declination: +21d 59m 07.80s
- Redshift: 0.029952
- Heliocentric radial velocity: 8,979 km/s
- Distance: 447 Mly (137 Mpc)
- Group or cluster: Copeland Septet
- Apparent magnitude (V): 14.3

Characteristics
- Type: SBc
- Size: 58,000 ly

Other designations
- PGC 36018, CGCG 127-012N, MCG +04-28-011, VV 282b, Copeland Septet NED07, 2MASS J1137549+2159080, SDSS J113754.92+215907.8, HCG 057D, NSA 112842, AGC 210537, NVSS J113754+215910, 2XMM J113755.0+215908, LEDA 36018

NGC 3754 is a small barred spiral galaxy located in the constellation Leo. It is located 447 million light-years away from the Solar System and was discovered on April 5, 1874, by Ralph Copeland.

The luminosity class of NGC 3754 is II and it is listed as a LINER galaxy by SIMBAD, meaning, a nucleus presenting an emission spectrum characterized by broad lines of weak ionized atoms.

== Copeland Septet ==
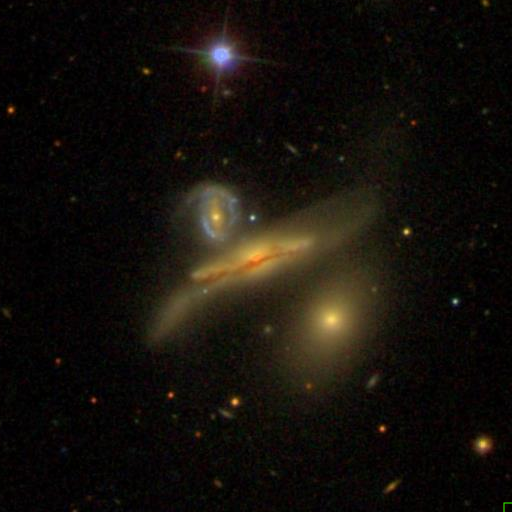
Sloan Digital Sky Survey image of NGC 3754 above two members of the Copeland Septet

NGC 3754 is a member of the Copeland Septet which is made up of 7 galaxies discovered by Copeland in 1874. The other members of the group, are NGC 3745, NGC 3746, NGC 3748, NGC 3750, NGC 3751 and NGC 3753.

Halton Arp noticed the seven galaxies in an article published in 1966. This group is designated as Arp 320 in which PGC 36010 is part of them.

The seven galaxies were also observed by Paul Hickson, in which he included them inside his article in 1982. This group is known as Hickson 57, in which NGC 3754 is designated as HCG 57D.
