= 1164 Kobolda =

Main-belt asteroid

Discovery
- Discovered by: K. Reinmuth
- Discovery site: Heidelberg Obs.
- Discovery date: 19 March 1930

Designations
- Named after: Hermann Kobold (German astronomer)
- Alternative designations: 1930 FB
- Minor planet category: main-belt · (inner); Phocaea

Orbital characteristics
- Epoch 4 September 2017 (JD 2458000.5)
- Uncertainty parameter 0
- Observation arc: 87.01 yr (31,782 days)
- Aphelion: 2.7574 AU
- Perihelion: 1.8543 AU
- Semi-major axis: 2.3059 AU
- Eccentricity: 0.1958
- Orbital period (sidereal): 3.50 yr (1,279 days)
- Mean anomaly: 15.684°
- Mean motion: 0° 16^{m} 53.4^{s} / day
- Inclination: 25.190°
- Longitude of ascending node: 156.96°
- Argument of perihelion: 341.25°

Physical characteristics
- Dimensions: 5.79±0.37 km 6.34±1.15 km 7.63 km (calculated); 7.651±0.064 km 8.751±0.066 km
- Synodic rotation period: 4.141±0.002 h 4.142±0.001 h 4.150±0.005 h (Note: Warner (2014l) not available at ADS. Obs. date: 16 April 2014. Rotation period 4.150±0.005 hours with a brightness amplitude of 0.21±0.02 mag. Quality Code of 3. Summary figures for (1164) Kobolda at Collaborative Asteroid Lightcurve Link (CALL)); 4.154±0.011 h
- Geometric albedo: 0.1754±0.0253; 0.229±0.022; 0.23 (assumed); 0.32±0.15; 0.405±0.056
- Spectral type: S
- Absolute magnitude (H): 12.80

1164 Kobolda, provisional designation 1930 FB, is a stony Phocaea asteroid from the inner regions of the asteroid belt, approximately 7 kilometers in diameter. Discovered by Karl Reinmuth at Heidelberg Observatory in 1930, the asteroid was later named after German astronomer Hermann Kobold.

== Discovery ==
Kobolda was discovered on 19 March 1930, by German astronomer Karl Reinmuth at the Heidelberg-Königstuhl State Observatory in southwest Germany. On the following night, it was independently discovered by Walter Baade at the Bergedorf Observatory in Hamburg. The Minor Planet Center, however, only acknowledges the first discoverer.

== Orbit and classification ==
Kobolda is a member of the Phocaea family (701), which is a stony family of nearly 2,000 known members, named after the family's parent body 25 Phocaea.

This asteroid orbits the Sun in the inner main-belt at a distance of 1.9–2.8 AU once every 3 years and 6 months (1,279 days). Its orbit has an eccentricity of 0.20 and an inclination of 25° with respect to the ecliptic. The body's observation arc begins with its official discovery observation at Heidelberg in 1930.

== Physical characteristics ==
Kobolda is an assumed stony S-type asteroid, which concurs with the overall spectral type of the Phocaea family.

=== Rotation period ===
Several rotational lightcurves of Kobolda have been obtained from photometric observations since 2007. Lightcurve analysis gave a well-defined rotation period between 4.141 and 4.154 hours with a brightness amplitude of 0.21 to 0.30 magnitude (U=3/3/3/2).

=== Diameter and albedo ===
According to the surveys carried out by the Japanese Akari satellite and the NEOWISE mission of NASA's Wide-field Infrared Survey Explorer, Kobolda measures between 5.79 and 8.751 kilometers in diameter and its surface has an albedo between 0.1754 and 0.405.

The Collaborative Asteroid Lightcurve Link assumes an albedo of 0.23 (derived from 25 Phocaea) and calculates a diameter of 7.63 kilometers based on an absolute magnitude of 12.8.

== Naming ==
This minor planet was named after Hermann Kobold (1858–1942), a German astronomer at Kiel University and long-time editor of the astronomy journal Astronomical Notes (German: Astronomische Nachrichten, after which (1155) was named). The official naming citation was mentioned in The Names of the Minor Planets by Paul Herget in 1955 (H 108).

== Trivia ==
=== Pluto's number ===
Were Pluto categorized as a minor planet when discovered in early 1930, shortly before 1164 Kobolda, the number (1164) could have been assigned to Pluto. However, these assumptions are only speculative as there is generally only a slight correlation between the discovery date of a minor planet and its final number. Another proposed number for Pluto was (10000), with the idea that (10001) and (10002) would be given to the first and second discovered Kuiper belt object. However the proposal met "stiff resistance" and the number was assigned to 10000 Myriostos instead. Eventually, Pluto was given the number (134340).
