= NGC 3753 =

Galaxy in Copeland Septet

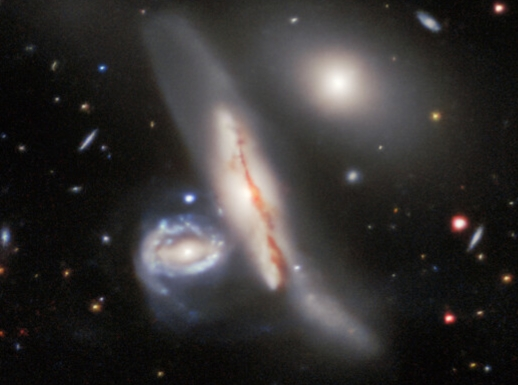
- NGC 3753 is sandwiched between NGC 3754 and NGC 3750

Observation data (J2000 epoch)
- Constellation: Leo
- Right ascension: 11h 37m 53.90s
- Declination: +21d 58m 53.0s
- Redshift: 0.029064
- Heliocentric radial velocity: 8,713 km/s
- Distance: 435 Mly (133.37 Mpc)
- Group or cluster: Copeland Septet
- Apparent magnitude (V): 14.52

Characteristics
- Type: Sb, LINER, SAb
- Size: 258,000 ly

Other designations
- PGC 36016, UGC 6602, VV 282a, KUG 1135+222, MCG +04-28-010, SPRC 203, Copeland Septet NED06, HCG 057A, 2MASS J11375380+2158520, 2MASX J11375378+2158520, SDSS J113753.78+215851.8, WBL 343-005, NSA 139944, SSTL2 J113753.80+215852.4, LEDA 36016

NGC 3753 is a large barred spiral galaxy located in the constellation Leo. It is located 435 million light-years away from the Earth and was discovered on February 9, 1874, by Ralph Copeland.

NGC 3753 is classified as a LINER galaxy, meaning it presents an emission spectrum characterized by broad lines of weak ionized atoms. It also has a luminosity class of I-II. NGC 3753 is viewed edge-on. The edge-on view is the reason why we see a dust lane in NGC 3753.

== Copeland Septet ==
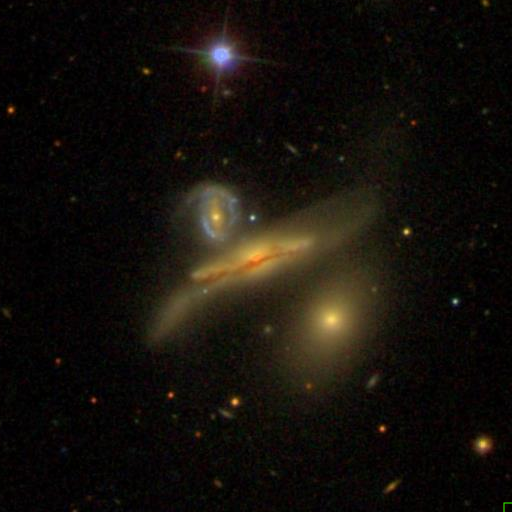
Sloan Digital Sky Survey image of NGC 3753 and two members of Copeland Septet.

NGC 3753 is a member of the Copeland Septet which consists of seven galaxies discovered by Copeland in 1874. The other members are NGC 3746, NGC 3745, NGC 3748, NGC 3750, NGC 3751 and NGC 3754.

Halton Arp noticed the seven galaxies in the group, in which he published the article in 1966. The group is designated as Arp 320 along another galaxy, PGC 36010.

This group was observed by Paul Hickson in which he included them in his article in 1982. The group is known as Hickson 57 in which NGC 3753 is the dominant member.
