= NGC 3750 =

Galaxy in the Copeland Septet

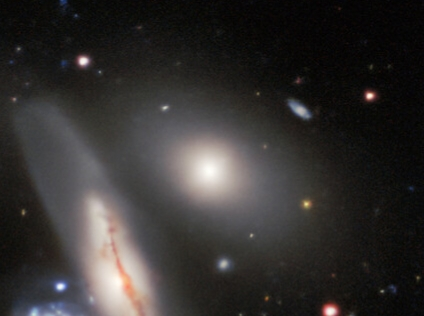
- NGC 3750 with NGC 3753 beneath it

Observation data (J2000 epoch)
- Constellation: Leo
- Right ascension: 11h 37m 51.637s
- Declination: +21d 58m 27.26s
- Redshift: 0.030258
- Heliocentric radial velocity: 9,071 km/s
- Distance: 450 Mly (138 Mpc)
- Group or cluster: Copeland Septet
- Apparent magnitude (V): 13.9
- Surface brightness: 23.7 mag/arcsec

Characteristics
- Type: SAB0?, E-S0
- Size: 156,000 ly

Other designations
- PGC 36011, CGCG 127-009, VV 282c, MCG +04-28-008, Copeland Septet NED04, HCG 057C, 2MASS J11375165+2158272, SDSS J113751.63+215827.2, NSA 112843, 2XMM J113751.7+215827, LEDA 36011

NGC 3750 is a barred lenticular galaxy located in the constellation of Leo It is located 450 million light years away from Earth. and was discovered by Ralph Copeland on February 9, 1874.

NGC 3750 has a surface brightness of magnitude 23.7 and is classified a LINER galaxy by SIMBAD, meaning it has a nucleus, presenting an emission spectrum characterized by broad lines of weakly ionized atoms.

== Copeland Septet ==
NGC 3750 is a member of the Copeland Septet which is made up of 7 seven galaxies discovered by Copeland. The other members are NGC 3745, NGC 3746, NGC 3748, NGC 3751, NGC 3753 and NGC 3754.

Halton Arp noticed the galaxies in the group, whom he published in his article in 1966. This group is designated as Arp 320 along with another galaxy, PGC 36010.

This group was also observed by Paul Hickson whom he included in his article in 1982. The group is known as Hickson 57, in which NGC 3750 is designated is HCG 57C.
