= NGC 7767 =

Galaxy in the constellation of Pegasus

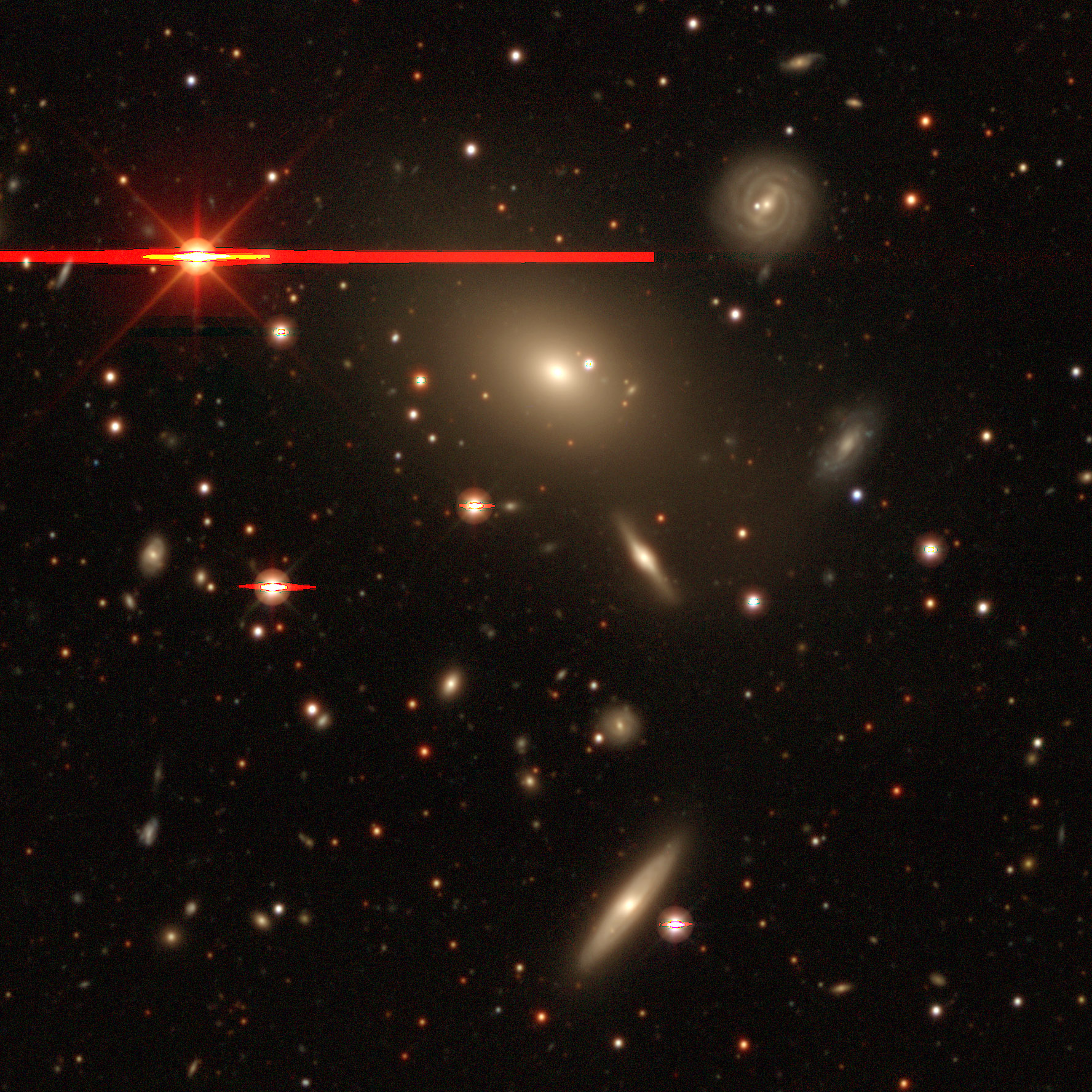
- NGC 7767 (bottom), as well as NGC 7765, NGC 7766 and NGC 7768

Observation data (J2000 epoch)
- Constellation: Pegasus
- Right ascension: 23^{h} 50^{m} 56.37^{s}
- Declination: 27° 05′ 13.66″
- Redshift: 0.026829
- Distance: 353.7 Mly (108.46 Mpc)

Characteristics
- Type: S0a

Other designations
- NGC 7767, IC 1511, UGC 12805

NGC 7767 is a 14th-magnitude lenticular galaxy located within the constellation Pegasus. It was discovered in 1872 by Ralph Copeland using Lord Rosse's 72-inch telescope. It is an S0a type galaxy with a redshift of 0.026829.
