= NGC 203 =

Galaxy in the constellation Pisces

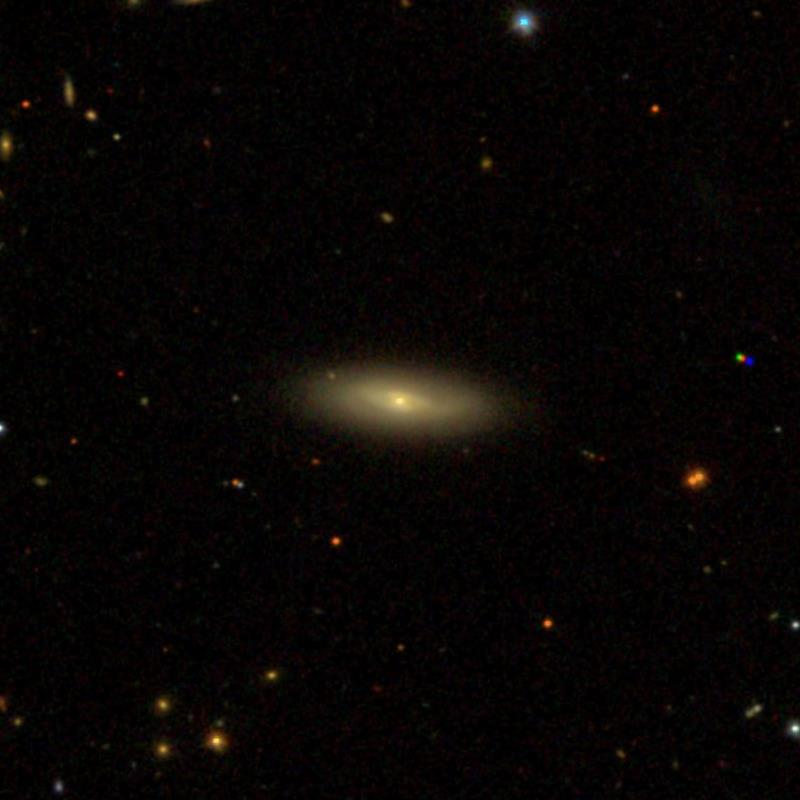
- SDSS image of NGC 203

Observation data (J2000 epoch)
- Constellation: Pisces
- Right ascension: 00^{h} 39^{m} 39.5^{s}
- Declination: +03° 26′ 34″
- Redshift: 0.017415
- Distance: 233 Mly
- Apparent magnitude (V): 14.97

Characteristics
- Type: S0
- Apparent size (V): 0.9' × 0.3'

Other designations
- NGC 211, CGCG 383-061, MCG +00-02-114, 2MASX J00393952+0326345, PGC 2393.

NGC 203 is a lenticular galaxy located approximately 233 million light-years from the Solar System in the constellation Pisces. It was discovered on December 19, 1873 by Ralph Copeland.

The galaxy is also listed as NGC 211 in the New General Catalogue.

== See also ==
- Lenticular galaxy
- List of NGC objects (1–1000)
- Pisces (constellation)
