= NGC 3751 =

Galaxy in the Copeland Septet

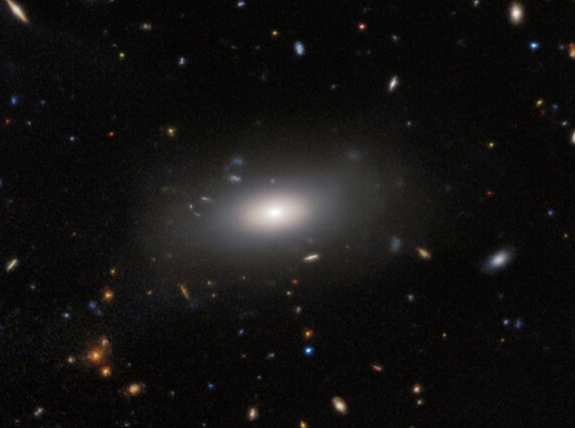
- NGC 3751

Observation data (J2000 epoch)
- Constellation: Leo
- Right ascension: 11h 37m 53.859s
- Declination: +21d 56m 11.34s
- Redshift: 0.031328
- Heliocentric radial velocity: 9,392 km/s
- Distance: 450 Mly (138 Mpc)
- Group or cluster: Copeland Septet
- Apparent magnitude (V): 14.3

Characteristics
- Type: E4, E-S0
- Size: 144,000 ly

Other designations
- PGC 36017, UGC 6601, MCG +04-28-009, 2MASX J11375386+2156110, SDSS J113753.85+215611.3, Copeland Septet NED05, HCG 057F, NSA 112845, SSTSL2 J113753.87+215611.2, LEDA 36017

NGC 3751 is a type E-S0 lenticular galaxy located in the constellation Leo. It is located 450 million light-years away from the Solar System and was discovered by Ralph Copeland on April 5, 1874.

To date, a non-redshift measurement gives a distance of approximately 138,000 Mpc (450 million light-years) for NGC 3751. This value is within the Hubble Distance values.

== Copeland Septet ==
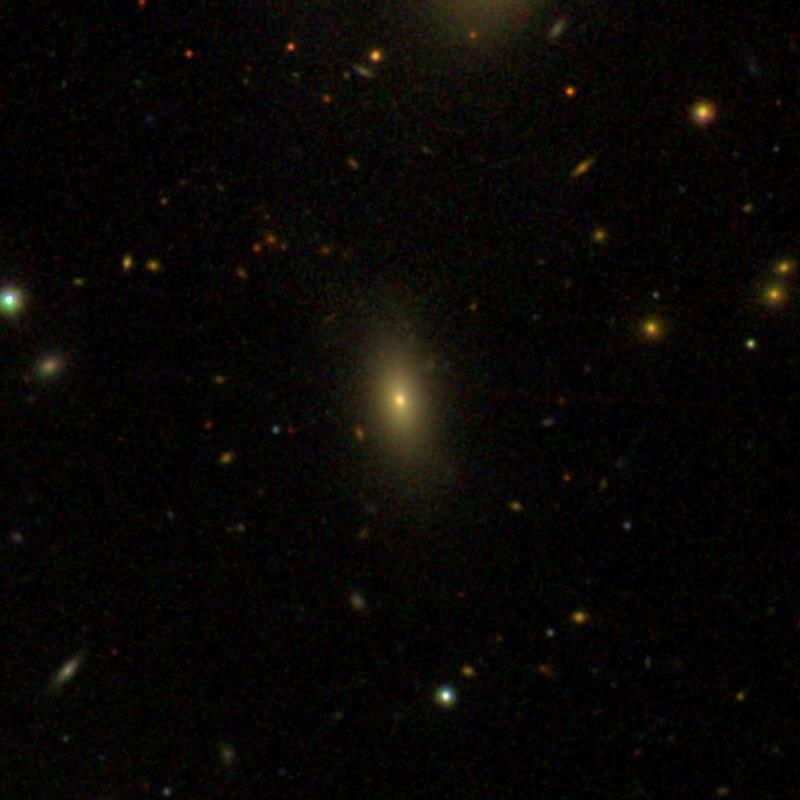
Sloan Digital Sky Survey of NGC 3751

NGC 3751 is a member of the Copeland Septet. The other members are NGC 3745, NGC 3746, NGC 3748, NGC 3750, NGC 3753 and NGC 3754.

Halton Arp noticed the seven galaxies in which he published inside his article in 1966. This group is known as Arp 320 in which another galaxy, PGC 36010 is part of it.

This group was also observed by Paul Hickson, in which he included them inside his article which was published in 1982. It is noted that this group is designated as Hickson 57. NGC 3751 is known as HCG 57F.
