= NGC 7768 =

Ecliptical Galaxy in the constellation Pegasus

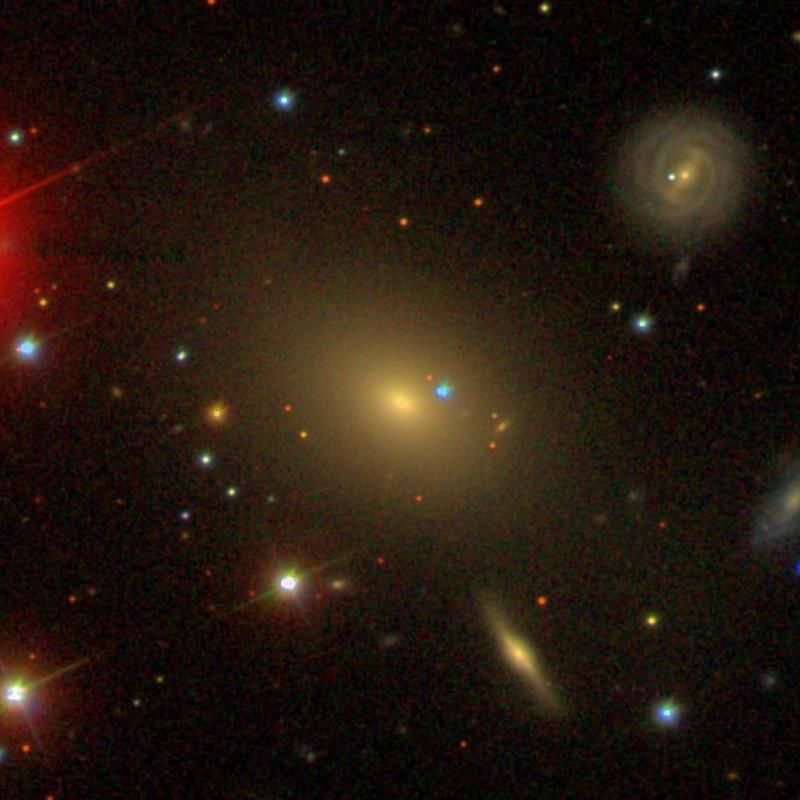
- NGC 7768 image by SDSS

Observation data (J2000 epoch)
- Constellation: Pegasus
- Right ascension: 23^{h} 50^{m} 58.5460^{s}
- Declination: +27° 08′ 50.415″
- Distance: 369 Mly

Characteristics
- Type: E

Other designations
- NGC 7768, UGC 12806, CGCG 477-019, CGCG 2348.4+2653, MCG +04-56-018

NGC 7768 is a large elliptical galaxy located in the constellation of Pegasus. Its velocity relative to the cosmic microwave background is 7,663 ± 28 km /s, which corresponds to a Hubble distance of 113.0 ± 7.9 Mpc (~369 million light-years). NGC 7768 was discovered by the British astronomer John Herschel in 1828.

NGC 7768 forms a pair of galaxies with NGC 7767. Observations made by the Hubble Space Telescope have shown that the galaxy's nucleus is surrounded by a disk of matter with a mass estimated at 7×10^{3} M_{☉}

== Supernova ==
One supernova has been observed in NGC 7768: SN 1968Z (type unknown, mag. 17.9) was discovered by Priser on 1 September 1968.

== Abell 2666 ==
NGC 7768 is the brightest galaxy (noted BCG) in the Abell 2666 galaxy cluster. According to Austrian amateur astronomer Bernhard Hubl, the other brightest galaxies in the cluster are NGC 7765, NGC 7766 and NGC 7767.

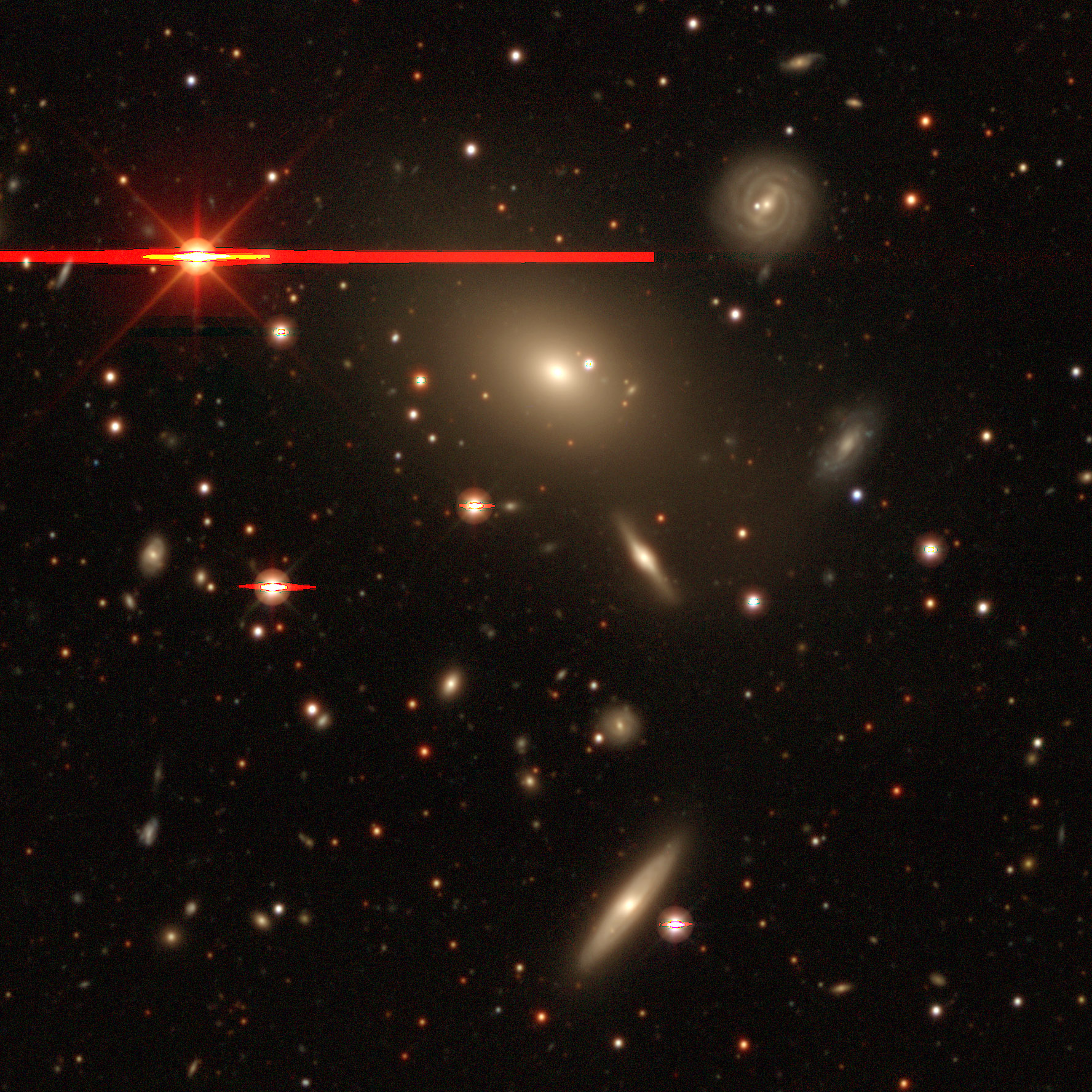
Abell 2666 Cluster image by DESI Legacy Survey
