= Ivan Varga =

Slovak politician (1953-2021)

Member of the National Council of Slovakia
- In office 15 October 2002 – 23 March 2016

Personal details
- Born: 15 June 1953 Hurbanovo, Czechoslovakia
- Died: 14 September 2021 (aged 68)
- Party: Direction – Social Democracy
- Education: Slovak University of Technology in Bratislava

Ivan Varga (15 June 1953 – 14 September 2021) was a Slovak politician. He served as a Member of the National Council of Slovakia from 2002 to 2016.

== Biography ==
Ivan Varga was born on 15 June 1953 in Hurbanovo. In 1977 he graduated with a chemical engineering degree from the Slovak University of Technology in Bratislava. Following graduation, he worked in the Slovak o pharma pharmaceutical compacities, which he priv.

In 1999, Varga was among the founding members of the Direction – Social Democracy. He served as a Member of the National Council of Slovakia between 2002 and 2016.

== Death ==
Varga died on 14 September 2021 at the age of 68 after a long illness. His death was announced by the Direction party on social media.
