= Copeland's Septet =

Group of galaxies in the constellation Leo

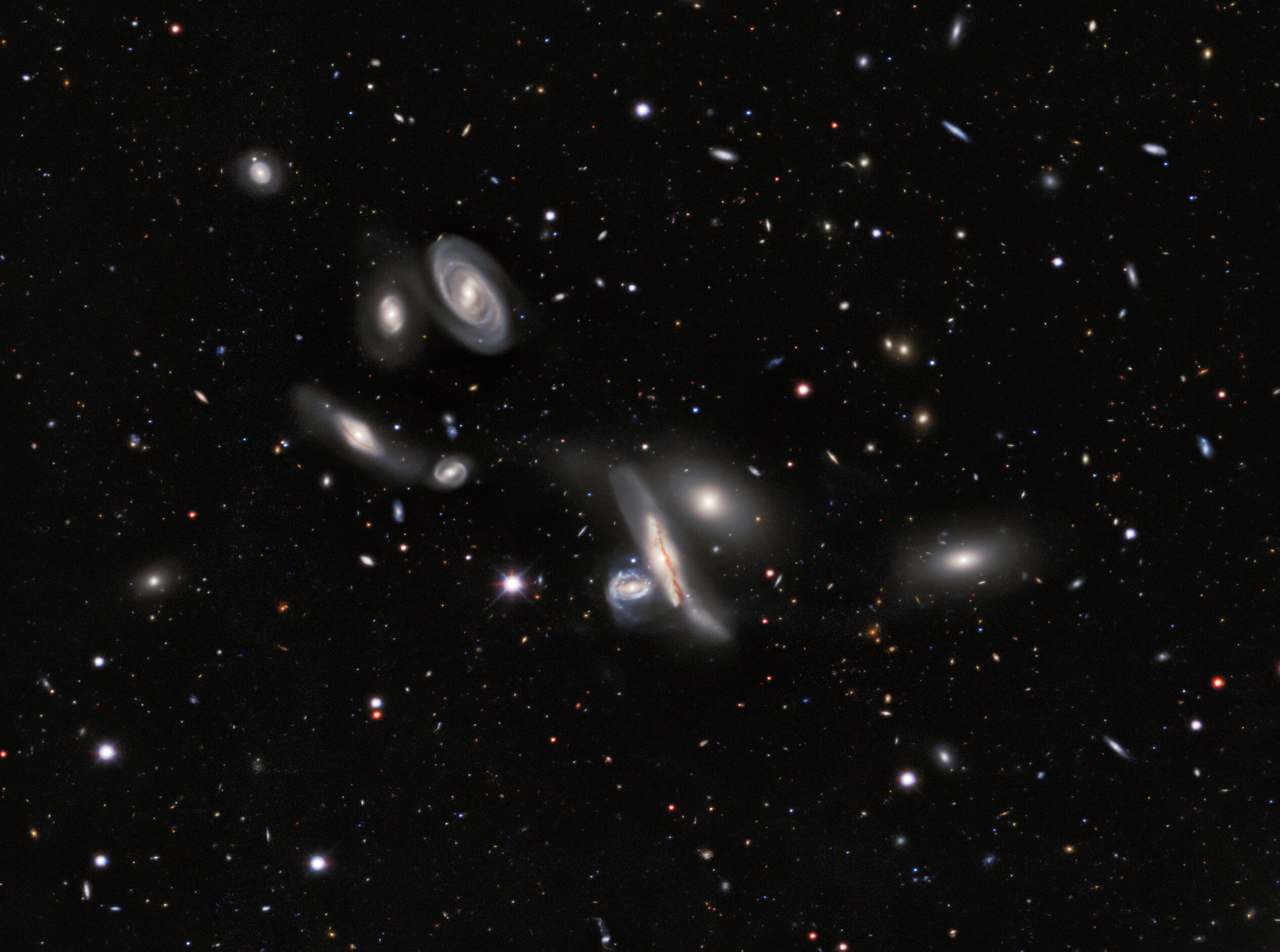
- A group of galaxies nicknamed the Copeland Septet, in the constellation of Leo.

Observation data (Epoch J2000)
- Constellation: Leo
- Right ascension: 11^{h} 37^{m} 50.5^{s}
- Declination: +21° 59′ 06″
- Brightest member: NGC 3753
- Number of galaxies: 8
- Redshift: 0.0304
- Distance: 132 Mpc (431 Mly) h^{−1}_{67.3}
- Binding mass: (6.1±1.0)×10^{14} h^{−1}_{50.00} M_{☉}
- X-ray luminosity: 10^{41.98} erg·s^{−1}

Other designations
- HCG 57, Arp 320

Copeland's Septet is a compact group of interacting galaxies located approximately 430 million light-years (132 Mpc) away in the constellation Leo. Although historically named a septet due to the seven primary galaxies detected in 19th-century visual observations, modern astronomical catalogs identify eight individual physical members within the group, designated HCG 57a through HCG 57h. The redshift of the brightest member, NGC 3753 places Copeland's Septet as a part of the Coma Supercluster.

== Member components ==
The group is dominated by NGC 3753 (HCG 57a), a magnitude 14.5 spiral galaxy and the largest component in the group. NGC 3753 forms a close physical pair with NGC 3754 (HCG 57d), a smaller spiral galaxy located immediately adjacent to it. Directly next to this pair is NGC 3750 (HCG 57c), an elliptical galaxy occupying the central region of the group core.

The western portion of the cluster contains NGC 3746 (HCG 57b), a barred spiral galaxy that has hosted two documented supernovae (SN 2002ar and SN 2005ba), and NGC 3748 (HCG 57e), an edge-on lenticular galaxy with a dust lane. The remaining cataloged components are NGC 3751 (HCG 57f), an elliptical galaxy on the southern edge of the core, NGC 3745 (HCG 57g), a faint lenticular galaxy, and PGC 36010 (HCG 57h), a 17th-magnitude dwarf spiral galaxy.

=== Gravitational interactions ===
The members of Copeland's Septet show evidence of strong tidal disruption caused by mutual gravitational encounters. Tidal interaction between NGC 3753 and NGC 3754 has drawn out long filaments of neutral hydrogen gas and stars into the intergalactic medium. Spectroscopic studies show that tidal forces have distorted galaxy disks and driven gas stripping throughout the cluster, triggering star formation within the spiral members.

== Discovery and history ==
British astronomer Ralph Copeland discovered the cluster on February 9, 1874, while observing from Birr Castle in Ireland using the 72-inch reflecting telescope. Copeland recorded seven visual members in the field and published the group under the title "The Septet."

In 1982, Paul Hickson included the system as entry 57 in his catalogue of compact galaxy groups, adding the faint dwarf galaxy PGC 36010 to the group designation as HCG 57h.

== See also ==
- Wild's Triplet
- Zwicky's Triplet
- Robert's Quartet
- Stephan's Quintet and NGC 7331 Group (also known as the Deer Lick Group located about half a degree northeast of Stephan's Quintet)
- Seyfert's Sextet
