= Fanny Susan Copeland =

Translator, mountaineer, journalist, linguist

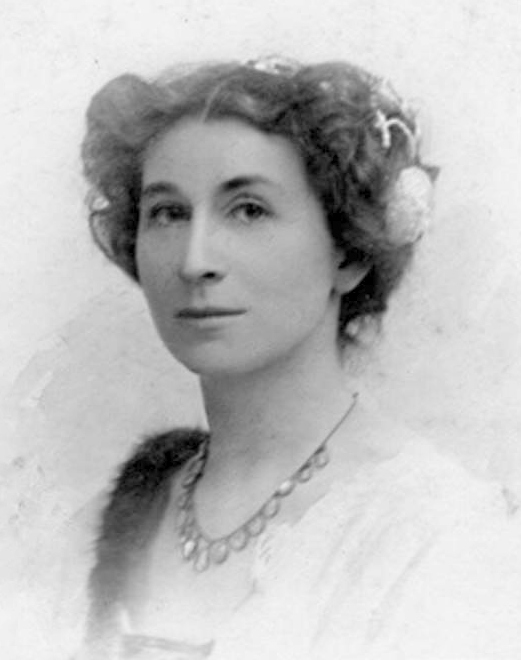
- Copeland in London
- Born: 27 September 1872; Parsonstown, King's County, Ireland
- Died: 28 July 1970 (aged 98); Ljubljana, SR Slovenia, SFR Yugoslavia
- Other name: Fanny S. Copeland Barkworth
- Occupations: Translator; mountaineer; journalist; linguist
- Spouse: John Edmund Barkworth (m. 1894; div. 1912)
- Father: Ralph Copeland

Fanny Susan Copeland OBE (27 September 1872 – 28 July 1970) was an Irish translator, mountaineer, journalist and linguist who lived much of her life in Slovenia.

== Biography ==
=== Early life ===
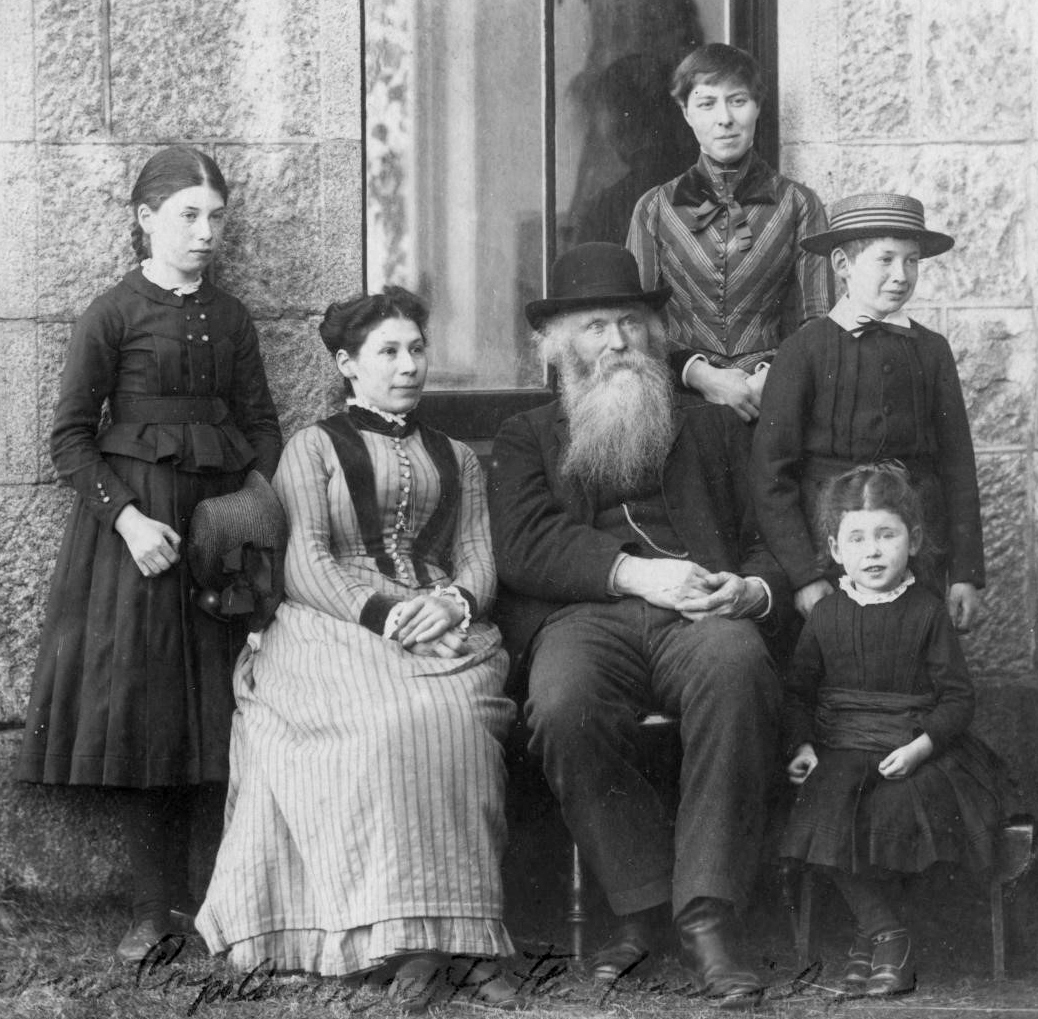
Copeland (left) with family in 1882

Copeland was born in Birr Castle in Parsonstown, County Offaly in 1872, when her father was assistant to Lord Rosse. Her father was astronomer Ralph Copeland, her mother was his second wife, Anna Teodora Berto. Because of her father's job, the family often moved. While she was in school in Berlin at the age of 13, they moved to Edinburgh. Her father was now the royal astronomer.

Copeland was trained as a singer along with her more general education.

=== Marriage and early career ===
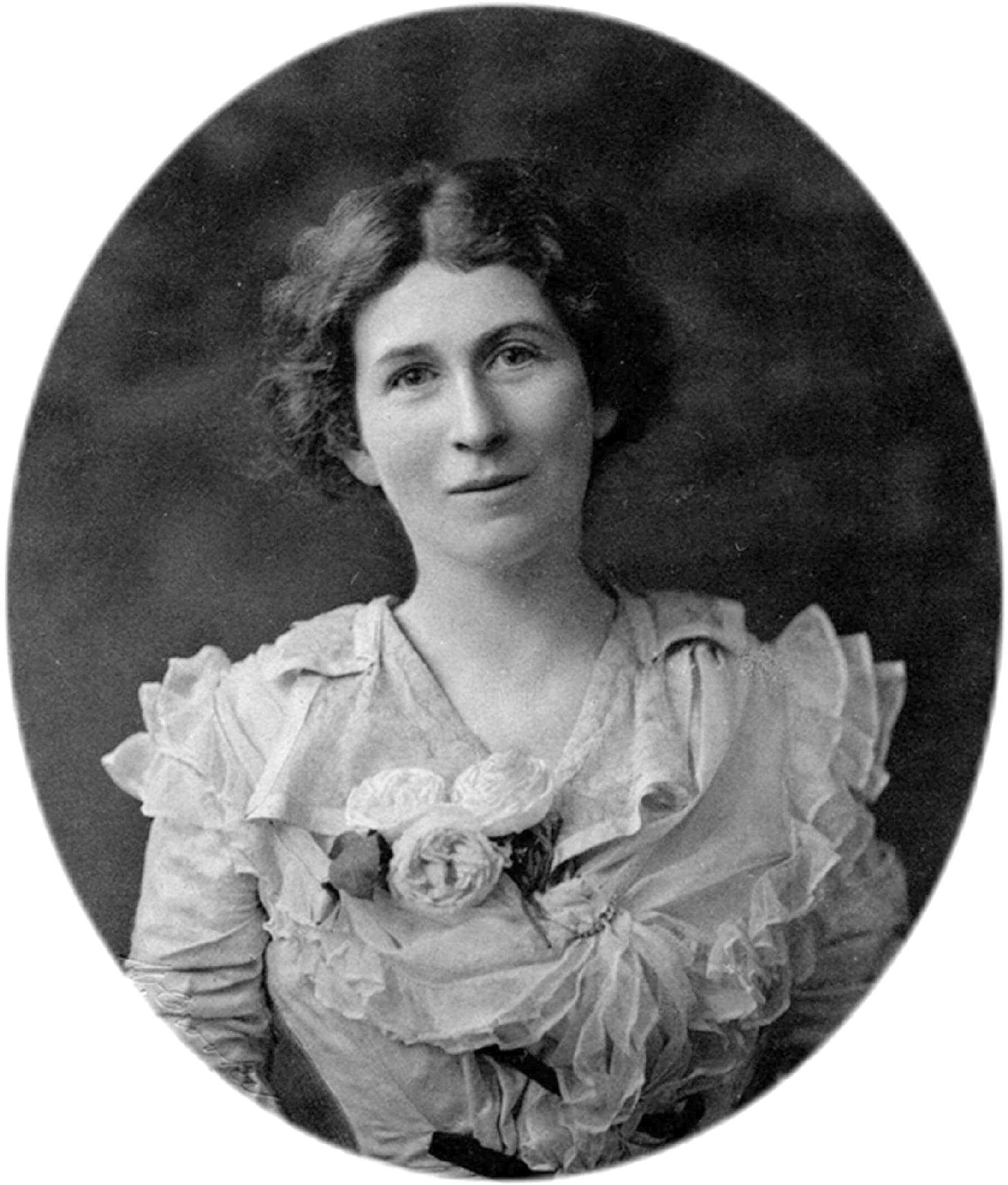
Copeland in Edinburgh

She became Fanny S. Copeland Barkwort when she married the 36-year-old John Edmund Barkworth when she was 22; he was a professor of music. The marriage broke up in 1908, by which time they had three children: Ralph, Harold and Lilian. They divorced in 1912 and Copeland left music and began writing.

=== World War I and Yugoslavia ===
By the 1910s she already spoke German, Italian, French, Danish, Norwegian, Latin, Slovene, Serbo-Croatian, and was capable of translating Bulgarian and Russian. Copeland worked on the Yugoslav Committee and the Serbian Press in London from 1915 to 1919. She worked as a translator for Ante Trumbić and the Kingdom of Serbs, Croats and Slovenes and as his personal secretary at the Paris Peace Conference. Copeland then began to work in the English department at the Faculty of Arts, at the University of The Kingdom of Serbs, Croats and Slovenes in Ljubljana. She began this role in 1921. Over the next 50 years the role expanded until Copeland had lectured to over 5000 students.

=== World War II ===
In 1939 Copeland was awarded an OBE for acting as an unofficial consul in her years living in Slovenia. She was deported to Italy in 1941. She was interned there in Bibbiana near Arezzo. It took until 1953 before she could obtain a visa to return to Yugoslavia. Copeland returned to Slovenia and lived the rest of her life there.

=== Slovenia ===
Throughout her career, Copeland developed strong ties between Britain and Slovenia. She published articles in Time and Tide, Graphic, The Observer, Discovery, European Commercial, London Mercury, The Near East and India, The Scotsman and Alpine Journal amongst others.

With the exception of the period of the Second World War and its aftermath, Copeland remained in Slovenia for the rest of her life, living at Hotel Slon in Ljubljana. She died in 1970 and is buried at Dovje near Mojstrana.

== Mountaineering ==
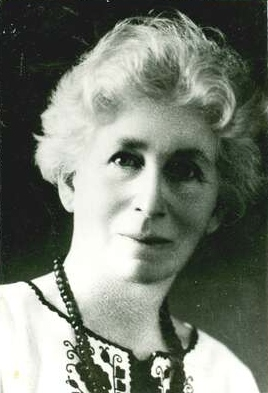
Copeland c.1920

She was a devoted mountaineer who wrote guides to the mountains and managed to climb the Tominškova trail with Joža Čop when she was 88. She was a member of the Skala tourist club and climbed all the peaks with Mira Marko Debelak Deržaj and Edo Deržaj, after the war. From 1925 to 1930 she also participated in discovery of new caves as a member of the Ljubljana Cave Exploration Society.

== Bibliography ==
- Report upon the atrocities committed by the Austro-Hungarian army during the first invasion of Serbia, 1916
- A bulwark against Germany; the fight of the Slovenes, the western branch of the Jugoslavs, for national existence, 1917
- Dalmatia and the Jugoslav Movement, c1920
- The bells : for orchestra, chorus and solo : op. 35, 1920

== External resources ==
- Fanny Copeland and the geographical imagination. Scottish Geographical Journal
- Manuscripts relating to the Second World War
- The British, Kugy, and Western Slovenia
- Lewis, Andrew (1 September 2003). "Major accessions to repositories in 2000 relating to women's history". Women's History Review. 12 (3). Informa UK Limited: 469–476. doi:10.1080/09612020300200369. ISSN 0961-2025. S2CID 161187280.
- IZUM – Institut informacijskih znanosti. "Pozabljena polovica : portreti žensk 19. in 20. stoletja na Slovenskem :: COBISS+". Osnovno iskanje (in Slovenian).
