= Radó von Kövesligethy =

Hungarian physicist, astronomer and geophysicist

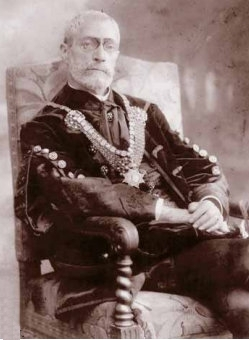
Radó Von Kövesligethy portrait

Radó von Kövesligethy (in Hungarian usage, Kövesligethy Radó) (1 September 1862 in Verona, then Austrian Empire – 11 October 1934 in Budapest, Hungary), was a Hungarian physicist, astronomer and geophysicist.

Kövesligethy developed a spectral equation for black body radiation for the continuous spectra of celestial bodies which had the following properties: the spectral distribution of radiation depends only on the temperature, the total irradiated energy is finite, the wavelength of the intensity maximum is inversely proportional to the temperature.

His work was published in 1885 in Hungarian and in 1890 in German, 15 years before the work by Planck and eight years before Wien's work on black body radiation).

Using his spectral equation, he estimated the temperature of several celestial bodies, including the Sun.

He also formulated laws to establish the epicenters of earthquakes.

He was an assistant to Loránd Eötvös.

In 1895, he was elected as a corresponding member of the Hungarian Academy of Sciences, and later (1909) as a full member.

His first and most outstanding disciple was the astrophysicist Béla Harkányi.

== Sources ==
- Ponticulus Hungaricus
- Balázs et al.:Astr.Nach/ AA 328 (2007), No 7 Short contributions AG 2007 Würzburg
- Kövesligethy Radó page 296-297:Magyarok a természettudományés a technika történetében, Országos müszaki információs központ és könyvtár, Budapest 1992
- NKFI-EPR:Selected topics on the history of astronomy in Hungary
- Zsoldos Endre: Kövesligethy Radó, Jókai Mór és az Androméda-köd
- Dr. Kövesligethy Radó: A szférák harmóniája (tudományos-fantasztikus mese)
- Bartha Lajos: Két tudomány-terület magyar úttörője: Kövesligethy Radó emlékezete
- Kosztolányi Dezső: Interjú Kövesligethy Radóval, eredeti megjelenés: Pesti Hírlap, 1925. május 24.
- Balázs Lajos: A kvantumelmélet Ógyallán született? (Természet Világa 2008/6)
- Szabados László (szerk.): Kövesligethy Radó és az asztrofizika kezdetei Magyarországon. (Konkoly Observatory of the Hungarian Academy of Sciences, Monographs No. 8. Bp. 2011.)
- Svensk uppslagsbok
