= Miklós Konkoly-Thege =

Hungarian astronomer and land-owning noble

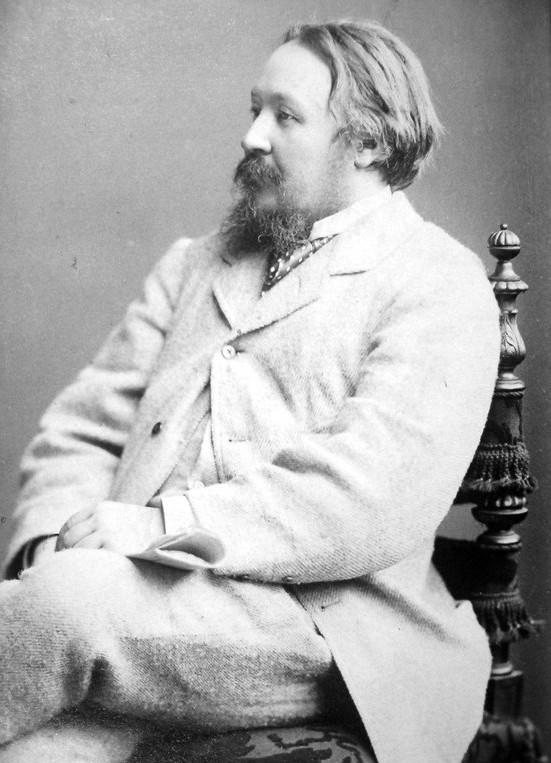
Miklós Konkoly-Thege

Miklós Konkoly-Thege (20 January 1842 – 17 February 1916) was a Hungarian astronomer and land-owning noble.

== History ==
He studied astronomy and physics at the universities of Budapest (1857–1860) and Berlin (1860–1862). After his studies he continued to visit the observatories of Göttingen, Greenwich, Heidelberg and Paris. During 1871 Konkoly-Thege constructed a telescope within his castle-residence, and in 1874 constructed an observatory in his palace park within Ógyalla (today town in Slovakia: Hurbanovo); observations from here were used by Radó Kövesligethy to produce the Ógyallan Catalogue of Spectra. From 1890 till 1911 he was the director of the Hungarian Institute of Meteorology and Geomagnetism. He has donated his private observatory to the state (Konkoly Observatory). He was a member of the Hungarian Academy of Sciences, and was also a member of the Parliament.

== Handbooks ==
Praktische Anleitung zur Anstellung astronomischer Beobachtungen mit besonderer Rücksicht auf die Astrophysik, nebst einer modernen Instrumentenkunde, Braunschweig, 1883

Praktische Anleitung zur Himmelsphotographie nebst einer kurzgefassten Anleitung zur modernen photographischen Operation und der Spectralphotographie im Cabinet, Halle, 1887

Handbuch für Spectroscopiker in Cabinet und am Fernrohr. Halle, 1890

== See also ==
- Konkoly Observatory
- Koppán (genus)
