= Mira Marko Debelak Deržaj =

Slovenian mountaineer, translator, and opinion journalist

Mira Debelak-Deržaj
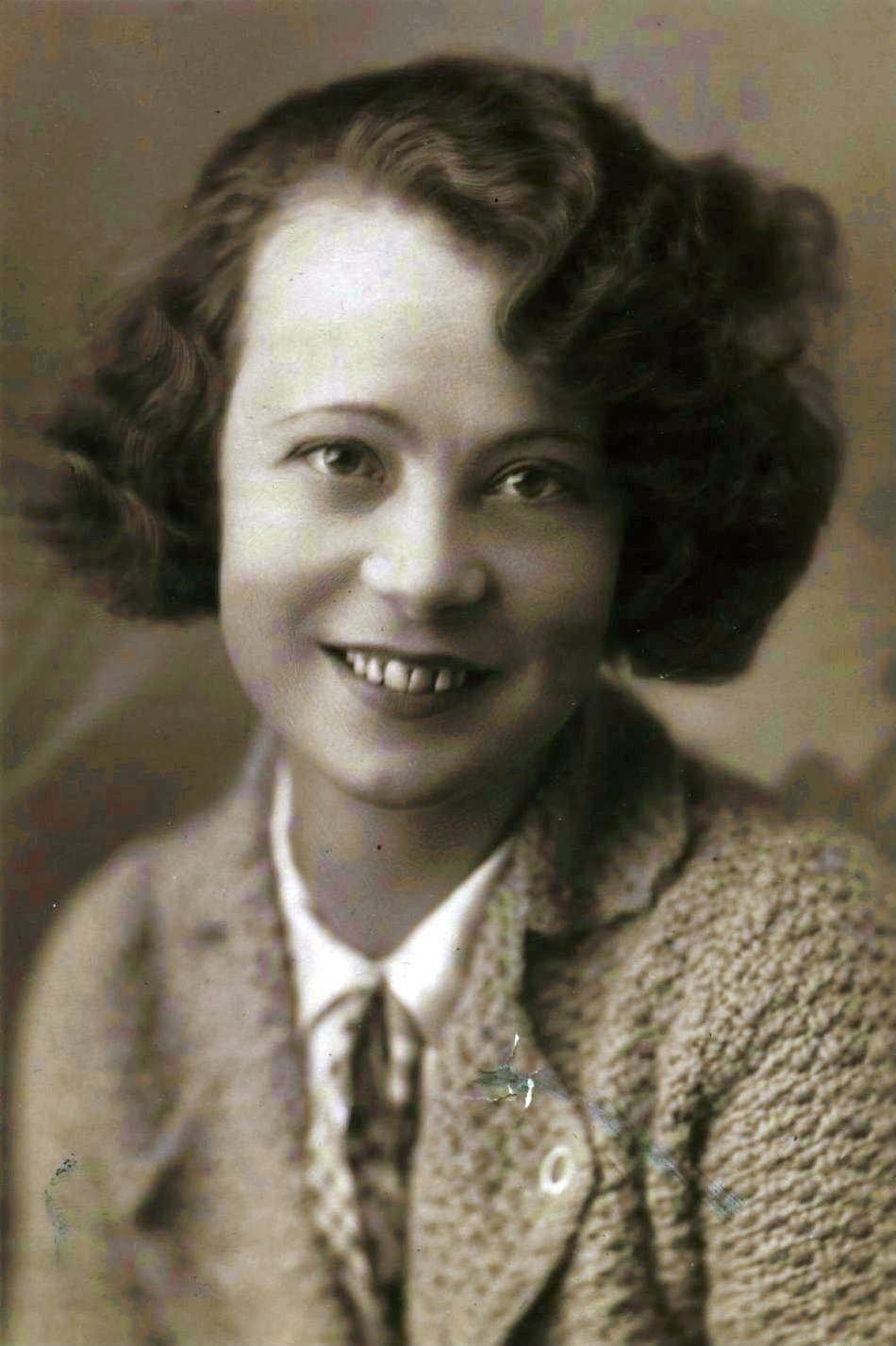

Personal information
- Nickname: Marko
- Born: Miroslava Marija Štefanija Debelak; 26 December 1904 Sarajevo, Bosnia and Herzegovina, Austria-Hungary
- Died: 27 September 1948 (aged 43) Ljubljana, PR Slovenia, Yugoslavia
- Occupation: Mountaineer
- Spouses: Božo Pibernik (div. 1933); Edo Deržaj (m. 1938)

Climbing career
- Type of climber: Rock and alpine climbing
- Updated on 24 September 2017

Mira Debelak-Deržaj (born Miroslava Marija Štefanija Debelak; 26 December 1904 – 27 September 1948), nicknamed Marko, was a Slovenian alpinist, skier, and journalist.

== Biography ==
She was born as Mira (also Miroslava Marija Štefanija) in Sarajevo in 1904, as the youngest of four children in her family. Her father was a state postal worker, and he often moved with his family through the Austro-Hungarian Empire. After returning to Ljubljana in 1918, to attend school. Her first major mountain tour was Stol in 1922, and Triglav in 1923. In February 1924, she performed the first ski tour from Kamnik to the Križ Pasture (Slovene: Kriška planina) and back and the first alpine climbing tour from the Stanič Lodge to Rjavina.

In 1924, she joined Skala (a mountaineering club in Slovenia) and did her first ski tour from Kamnik to the Križ Pasture and back, and her first alpine climbing tour from the Stanič Lodge to Rjavina. She was considered one of the most successful alpinists between the two world wars. She climbed a lot in Slovenia and also abroad. Among her most prominent achievements is the first ascent on the northern wall of Špik in 1926 with partner Stane Tominšek, and in Scotland, when she climbed the Slovenian direction in 1937 in the wall of Ben Nevis along with Ed Deržaj. Together, she performed about 100 alpine climbs, of which 23 primary routes, several winter climbs and challenging ski slopes, as the first woman was accepted as the first woman into the Austrian Academic Club.

In an arranged marriage, she married Božo Pibernik, from whom she separated and changed her surname back to Debelak in 1933. It was only after she converted from the Roman Catholic Church to the Old Catholic Church that she could formally marry Edo Deržaj in 1938. Early in mountain-climbing circles, she received the nickname Marko.

Her mountaintop career was also marked by a poor relationship with Pavla Jesih and a serious accident by a fellow climber, Edo Deržaj, on the Triglav Wall in 1927. Because many did not believe the explanation of the accident, Mira Marko was sued, and she and Deržaj were expelled from Skala.

She died on 27 September 1948 in Ljubljana.

== Bibliography ==
From 1925, she had masterfully described her ascents and mountain tours in Planinski vestnik.

In 1933, she wrote Climbing Technique, the first serious climbing manual in Slovenia.

In 1936, together with Fanny Susan Copeland, she published A Short Guide to the Slovenian Alps (Yugoslavia) for British and American Tourists.

She translated Kugy's work From My Life in the Mountains (1937).

Her Chronicle of Triglav, which was published in Planinski vestnik (1947–1949), was the most carefully analysed overview of Triglav elevations and events along Triglav for the time of 1744-1940.
