= Zlatý Bažant =

Slovak beer brand

Zlatý Bažant Golden Pheasant
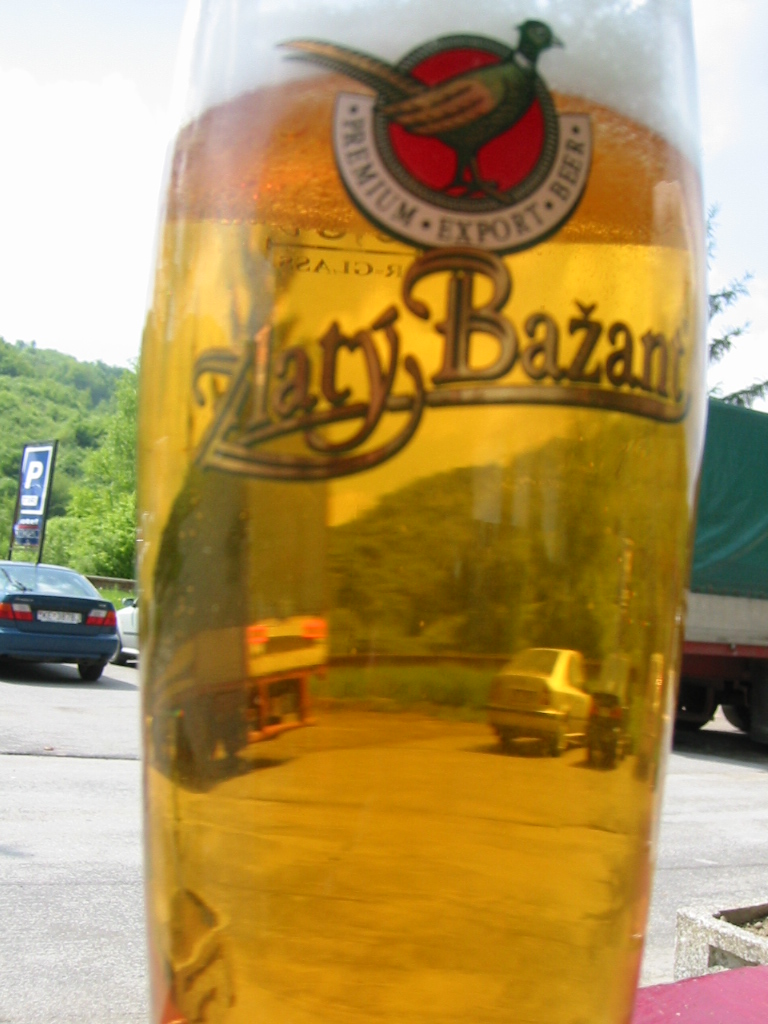
- Zlatý Bažant
- Type: Beer
- Manufacturer: Heineken International in Hurbanovo
- Origin: Central Europe
- Introduced: 1969
- Website: www.zlatybazant.sk

Zlatý Bažant (English: Golden Pheasant) is the most exported Slovak beer brand. It was founded in 1969 and is produced at its brewery in Hurbanovo. It was acquired by the Heineken International group in 1995.

It is distributed in the United States and Canada under the name Golden Pheasant, a translation of its native name.

== History ==
Zlatý Bažant gets its name from the surrounding area of Hurbanovo which is a small town located Southeast of Slovakia's capital. Bratislava had a large amount of pheasants during the 1970s that were gold in color which inspired the name.

In 1971, Zlatý Bažant began to be sold in cans which was the first-ever beer in Czechoslovakia and Eastern Europe to be produced in such a way. Zlatý Bažant bought the non-alcoholic beer Pito in the 1980s. Today, Zlatý Bažant "nealko" continues this tradition. The brand was named the top Slovak trademark in a review by Slovak daily Hospodárske noviny in 2008. On April 1, 2011, Radler Pheasant, a beer-based drink with lemonade, was launched in both non-alcoholic and alcoholic options. In April 2016, Zlatý Bažant 73 beer was launched, inspired by the oldest preserved draft brew of Zlatý Bažant from 16 April 1973.

== Brewery ==
Zlatý Bažant is brewed in Hurbanovo Slovakia, which was chosen because of its warm climate, having highest temperature in Slovakia all year round on average. The town is 114 meters above sea level. The warmer climate allows for the hops to thrive and grow.
