= Hurbanovo =

Hurbanovo Ógyalla
- Municipality
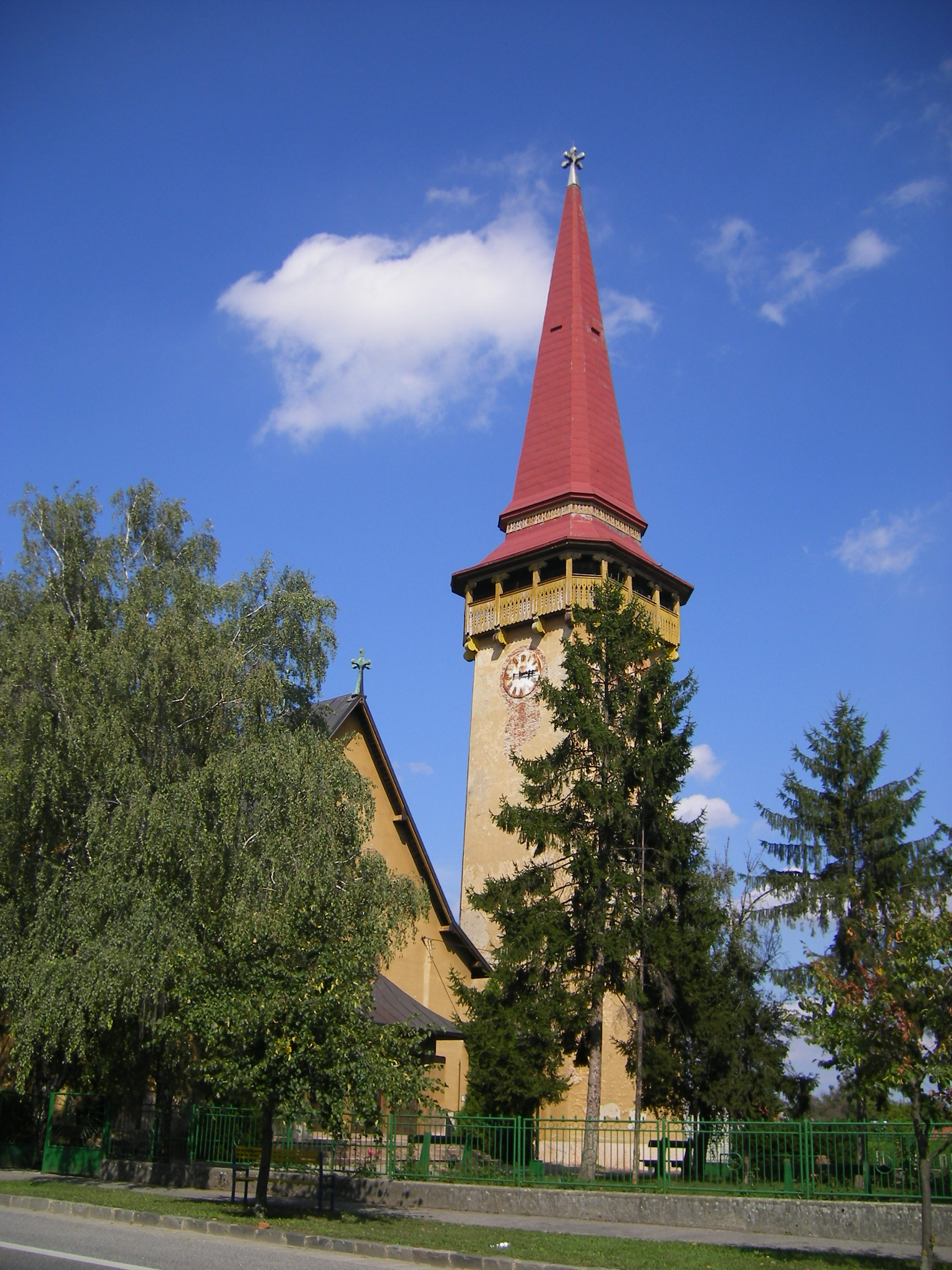
- Saint Ladislaus Church

- Flag Coat of arms

- Location of Hurbanovo in the Nitra Region Location of Hurbanovo in Slovakia
- Coordinates: 47.88°N 18.19°E
- Country: Slovakia
- Region: Nitra Region
- District: Komárno District
- First mentioned: 1329

Area
  - Total: 59.94 km^{2} (23.14 sq mi)
- Elevation: 114 m (374 ft)

Population (2025)
  - Total: 7,111
- Time zone: UTC+1 (CET)
  - Summer (DST): UTC+2 (CEST)
- Postal code: 947 01
- Area code: +421 35
- Vehicle registration plate (until 2022): KN
- Website: hurbanovo.sk

Hurbanovo (until 1948 Stará Ďala, Hungarian: Ógyalla, German: Altdala) is a town and large municipality in the Komárno District in the Nitra Region of south-west Slovakia. In 1948, its Slovak name was changed to Hurbanovo, named - despite to the will of locals - after Slovak writer Jozef Miloslav Hurban. The village was annexed to Czechoslovakia in 1920.

== History ==
In historical records the town was first mentioned in 1329.

== Geography ==
The municipality lies at an altitude of 114 metres (374 ft) and covers an area of 59.94 km^{2} (23.14 sq mi) (2025). Hurbanovo is situated on the climatically warmest location of the Podunajská nížina lowland, and it is located on the left bank of the Žitava river in the area with an altitude around 115 metres above the sea level.

== Population ==
Population statistic (10 years)
| Year | 1995 | 2005 | 2015 | 2025 |
|---|---|---|---|---|
| Count | 7907 | 8060 | 7566 | 7111 |
| Difference | | +1.93% | −6.12% | −6.01% |

Population statistic
| Year | 2024 | 2025 |
|---|---|---|
| Count | 7178 | 7111 |
| Difference | | −0.93% |

It has a population of 7111 people (31 December 2025).

=== Ethnicity ===
Census 2021 (1+%)
| Ethnicity | Number | Fraction |
|---|---|---|
| Slovak | 3940 | 52.76% |
| Hungarian | 3312 | 44.35% |
| Not found out | 467 | 6.25% |
| Romani | 201 | 2.69% |
| Total | 7467 | |

In year 2021 was 7467 people by ethnicity 3940 as Slovak, 3312 as Hungarian, 467 as Not found out, 201 as Romani, 42 as Czech, 19 as Other, 8 as Polish, 7 as Russian, 6 as Rusyn, 4 as Turkish, 3 as Canadian, 2 as Vietnamese, 2 as German, 2 as Korean, 2 as English, 1 as Jewish, 1 as Ukrainian, 1 as Serbian, 1 as Romanian and 1 as Croatian.

Note on population: The difference values of population numbers in the table "Population statistic" and in the sections "Ethnicity" & "Religion" is caused by the use of various statistical methods.

=== Religion ===
Census 2021 (1+%)
| Religion | Number | Fraction |
|---|---|---|
| Roman Catholic Church | 4458 | 59.7% |
| None | 1560 | 20.89% |
| Not found out | 623 | 8.34% |
| Calvinist Church | 398 | 5.33% |
| Evangelical Church | 171 | 2.29% |
| Baptists Church | 78 | 1.04% |
| Total | 7467 | |

In year 2021 was 7467 people by religion 4458 from Roman Catholic Church, 1560 from None, 623 from Not found out, 398 from Calvinist Church, 171 from Evangelical Church, 78 from Baptists Church, 53 from Greek Catholic Church, 31 from Jehovah's Witnesses, 23 from Christian Congregations in Slovakia, 17 from Other and not ascertained christian church, 12 from Ad hoc movements, 9 from Other, 7 from Islam, 5 from Old Catholic Church, 5 from Eastern Orthodox Church, 5 from Buddhism, 4 from Paganism and natural spirituality, 3 from Hinduism, 2 from Seventh-day Adventist Church, 1 from United Methodist Church, 1 from Czechoslovak Hussite Church and 1 from Apostolic Church.

According to the 2021 census, the municipality had 7,467 inhabitants. 3,780 (or 50,62 %) of inhabitants were Slovaks, 3,038 (or 40,69 %) Hungarians, 179 (2,4 %) Roma, 28 (0,37 %) Czechs, 468 others and unspecified.

== Government ==
The town has a birth registry, a police force and a tax office.

== Facilities ==
The town has a public library, a DVD rental store and a cinema. It also has a football pitch. The town has a commercial bank and insurance company and number of general and food stores. It has a doctor's surgery and an outpatient facility for children and adolescents and a gynaecologist. A brewery, called Zlatý Bažant, also operates in the town.

== Transport ==
The town has a garage and petrol station and a railway station.

== Notable people ==
- Gabriela Dudeková (born 1968), historian
- Árpád Feszty (1856–1914), painter
- Miklós Konkoly-Thege (1842–1916), astronomer
- Ivan Varga (1953–2021), politician

== Climate ==
Climate in this area has mild differences between highs and lows, and there is adequate rainfall year-round. The Köppen Climate Classification subtype for this climate is "Cfa". (humid subtropical climate). On 20 July 2007, Hurbanovo recorded a temperature of 40.3 °C (104.5 °F), which was the highest temperature ever recorded in Slovakia until summer 2026.

Climate data for Hurbanovo (1991–2020 normals, extremes 1919–present)
| Month | Jan | Feb | Mar | Apr | May | Jun | Jul | Aug | Sep | Oct | Nov | Dec | Year |
|---|---|---|---|---|---|---|---|---|---|---|---|---|---|
| Record high °C (°F) | 17.0 (62.6) | 20.8 (69.4) | 25.7 (78.3) | 31.1 (88.0) | 33.7 (92.7) | 37.3 (99.1) | 40.3 (104.5) | 40.6 (105.1) | 35.4 (95.7) | 29.3 (84.7) | 23.2 (73.8) | 19.0 (66.2) | 40.6 (105.1) |
| Mean daily maximum °C (°F) | 3.4 (38.1) | 6.4 (43.5) | 11.9 (53.4) | 18.3 (64.9) | 22.8 (73.0) | 26.4 (79.5) | 28.5 (83.3) | 28.4 (83.1) | 22.8 (73.0) | 16.6 (61.9) | 9.8 (49.6) | 4.0 (39.2) | 16.6 (61.9) |
| Daily mean °C (°F) | 0.1 (32.2) | 1.8 (35.2) | 6.1 (43.0) | 12.0 (53.6) | 16.6 (61.9) | 20.3 (68.5) | 22.0 (71.6) | 21.4 (70.5) | 16.1 (61.0) | 10.8 (51.4) | 5.9 (42.6) | 1.0 (33.8) | 11.2 (52.2) |
| Mean daily minimum °C (°F) | −3.0 (26.6) | −2.0 (28.4) | 1.4 (34.5) | 5.9 (42.6) | 10.5 (50.9) | 13.7 (56.7) | 15.6 (60.1) | 15.2 (59.4) | 11.0 (51.8) | 6.4 (43.5) | 2.7 (36.9) | −1.7 (28.9) | 6.3 (43.3) |
| Record low °C (°F) | −23.5 (−10.3) | −35.0 (−31.0) | −21.4 (−6.5) | −5.9 (21.4) | −2.9 (26.8) | 0.2 (32.4) | 4.5 (40.1) | 4.5 (40.1) | −2.4 (27.7) | −13.0 (8.6) | −14.1 (6.6) | −22.3 (−8.1) | −35.0 (−31.0) |
| Average precipitation mm (inches) | 34.1 (1.34) | 30.1 (1.19) | 35.9 (1.41) | 32.1 (1.26) | 62.0 (2.44) | 60.8 (2.39) | 69.0 (2.72) | 54.8 (2.16) | 56.5 (2.22) | 46.6 (1.83) | 47.6 (1.87) | 40.9 (1.61) | 570.5 (22.46) |
| Average precipitation days (≥ 1.0 mm) | 7.1 | 6.5 | 6.3 | 5.2 | 8.6 | 7.5 | 7.2 | 6.4 | 6.3 | 6.6 | 8.0 | 7.1 | 82.9 |
| Average snowy days | 7.7 | 6.5 | 3.6 | 0.6 | 0.0 | 0.0 | 0.0 | 0.0 | 0.0 | 0.2 | 2.7 | 6.0 | 27.3 |
| Average relative humidity (%) | 82.1 | 77.7 | 69.4 | 62.0 | 64.6 | 67.5 | 66.1 | 66.2 | 72.6 | 78.4 | 84.1 | 84.9 | 73.0 |
| Mean monthly sunshine hours | 70.9 | 99.9 | 152.5 | 210.0 | 251.2 | 266.0 | 281.1 | 273.8 | 190.7 | 136.8 | 78.3 | 58.3 | 2,069.5 |
Source 1: NOAA
Source 2: SHMI (extremes, 1919-present)

== Twin towns — sister cities ==
Hurbanovo is twinned with:

- Lovran, Croatia
- Pápa, Hungary
- Žlutice, Czech Republic

== Gallery ==
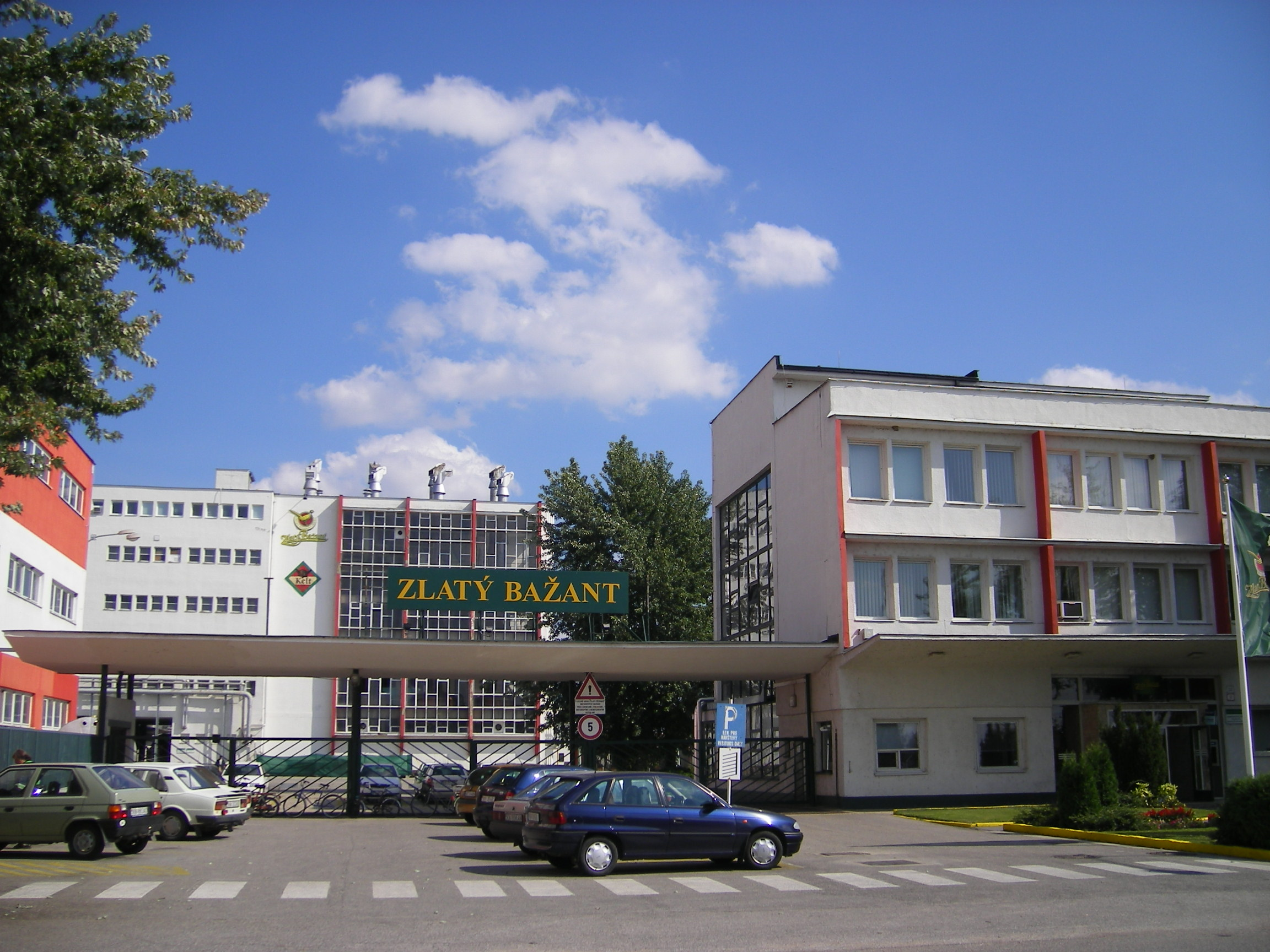
Local Zlatý Bažant brewery

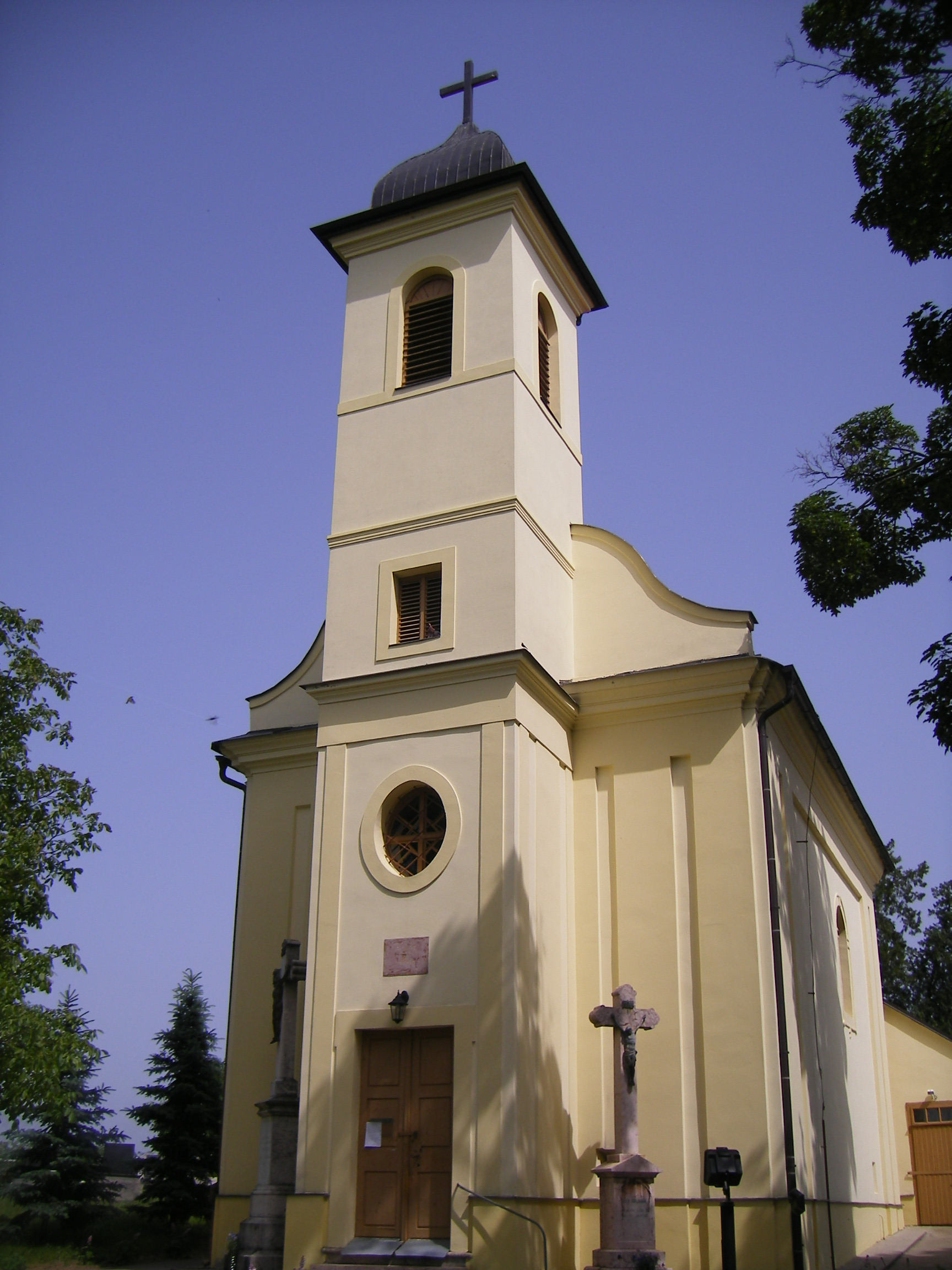
Church of Saint Anne

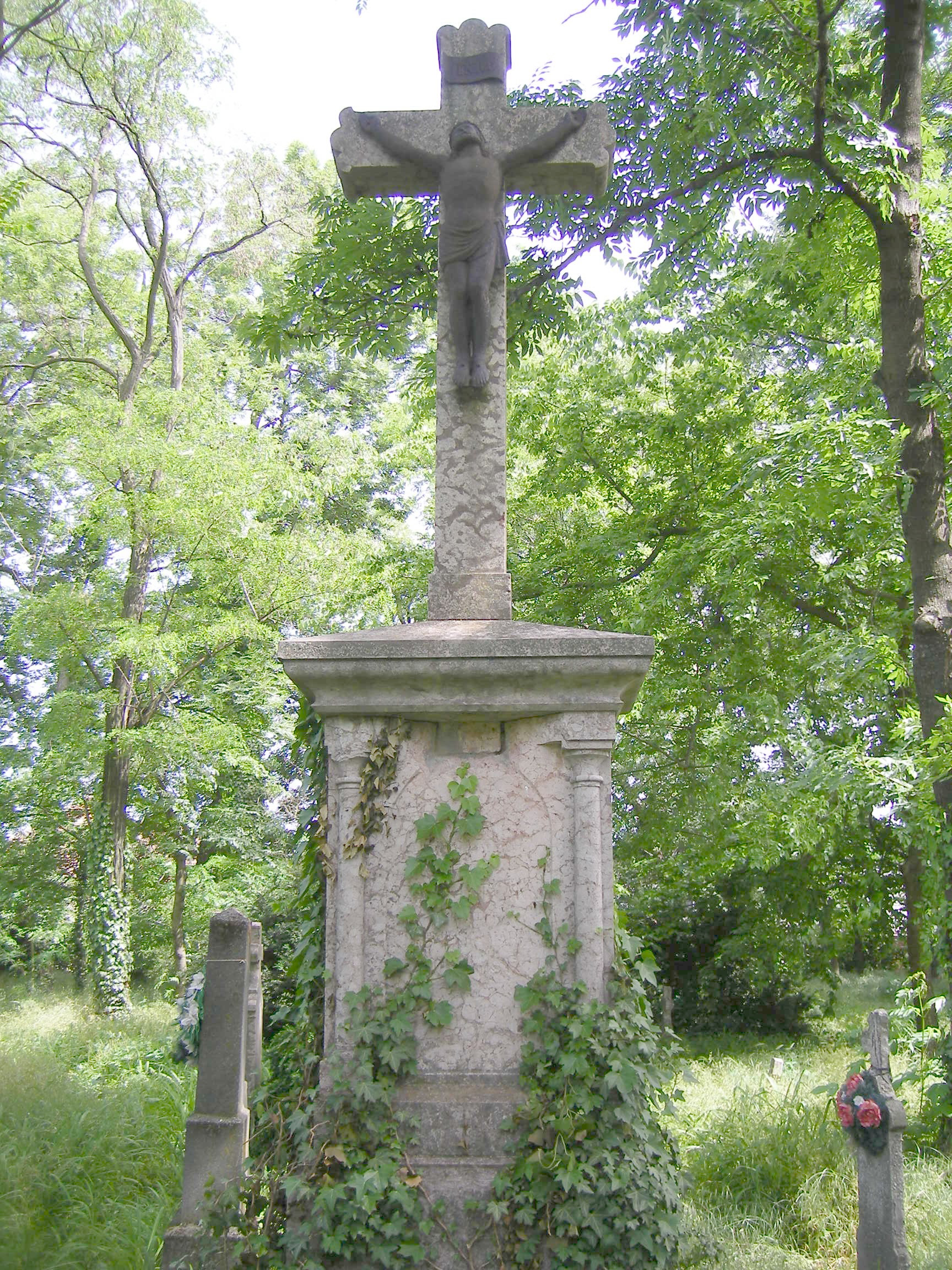
Bohatá Cemetery

== See also ==
- List of municipalities and towns in Slovakia

== Genealogical resources ==
The records for genealogical research are available at the state archive "Státný archiv in Nitra, Slovakia"

- Roman Catholic church records (births/marriages/deaths): 1764-1918 (parish A)
- Reformated church records (births/marriages/deaths): 1793-1942 (parish A)
