= Hermann Kobold =

German astronomer

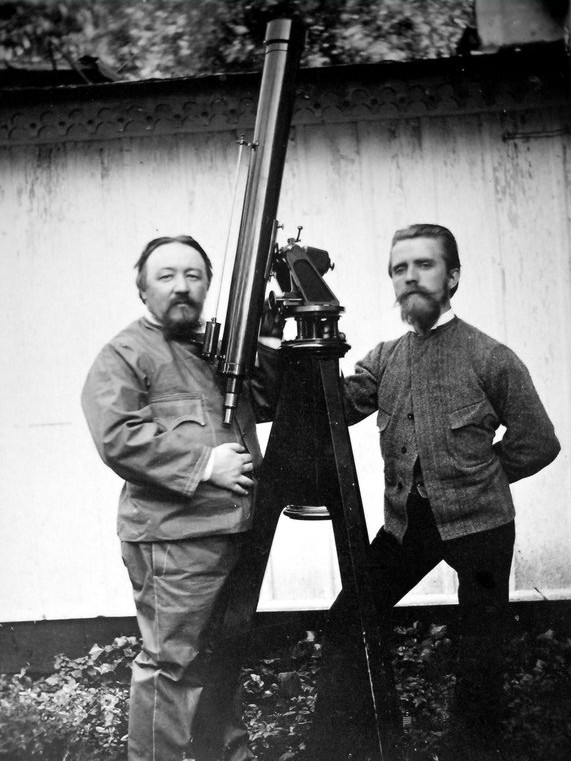
Miklós Konkoly-Thege and Hermann Kobold.

Hermann Kobold (5 August 1858 – 11 June 1942) was a German astronomer.

== Biography ==
Hermann Albert Kobold was born in Hanover, Kingdom of Hanover, the third of five children of the carpenter August Kobold and his wife Dorette Kobold (née Denker). From 1877 to 1880, he studied mathematics and natural sciences at the University of Göttingen and attained a doctorate in astronomy in July 1880 with Wilhelm Klinkerfues as his adviser.

Subsequently, he was an assistant at the private observatory of Miklos von Konkoly-Thege in Ógyalla, Hungary (now Hurbanovo, Slovakia). After the participation in an expedition to observe the 1882 transit of Venus in Aiken, South Carolina, he worked in Berlin some years analysing data from the observation.

=== Life in Strasbourg ===
In 1887, Kobold was appointed to the observatory in Strasbourg, France (German Empire at the time). That same year, he married Dorothea Brandt, with whom he had four children. In 1888, he became a private lecturer and in 1900 extraordinary professor (außerordentlicher Professor) at the University of Strasbourg; two years later, he went to the University of Kiel as an observator and extraordinary professor.

By intensive observations he discovered 22 previously unknown, smaller galaxies of the Coma galaxy cluster.

=== Astronomische Nachrichten ===
From 1908 to 1938, he was the publisher of the astronomy journal Astronomische Nachrichten. An asteroid discovered by Karl William Reinmuth received the name 1164 Kobolda in Kobold's honor in the 1930s.

=== Death ===
On 11 June 1942, Kobold died in Kiel, Germany.
