= Ralph Copeland =

English astronomer

Ralph Copeland FRSE, FRAS
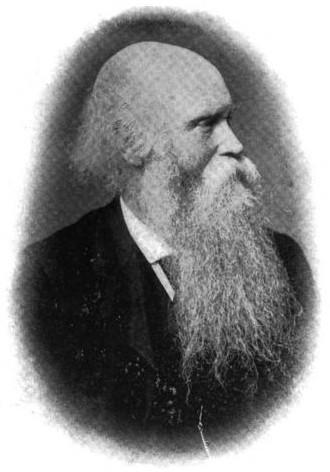
- Born: 3 September 1837; Moorside Farm, near Woodplumpton, Lancashire, England
- Died: 27 October 1905 (aged 68); Edinburgh, Scotland
- Burial place: Morningside Cemetery, Edinburgh
- Education: Kirkham Grammar School
- Occupation: astronomer
- Known for: Astronomer Royal for Scotland
- Notable work: discovered 35 NGC objects
- Spouses: Susannah Milner (m. 1859) Theodora Benfey (m. 1871)
- Children: six, including Fanny Susan Copeland
- Parents: Robert Copeland (father); Elizabeth Milner (mother)

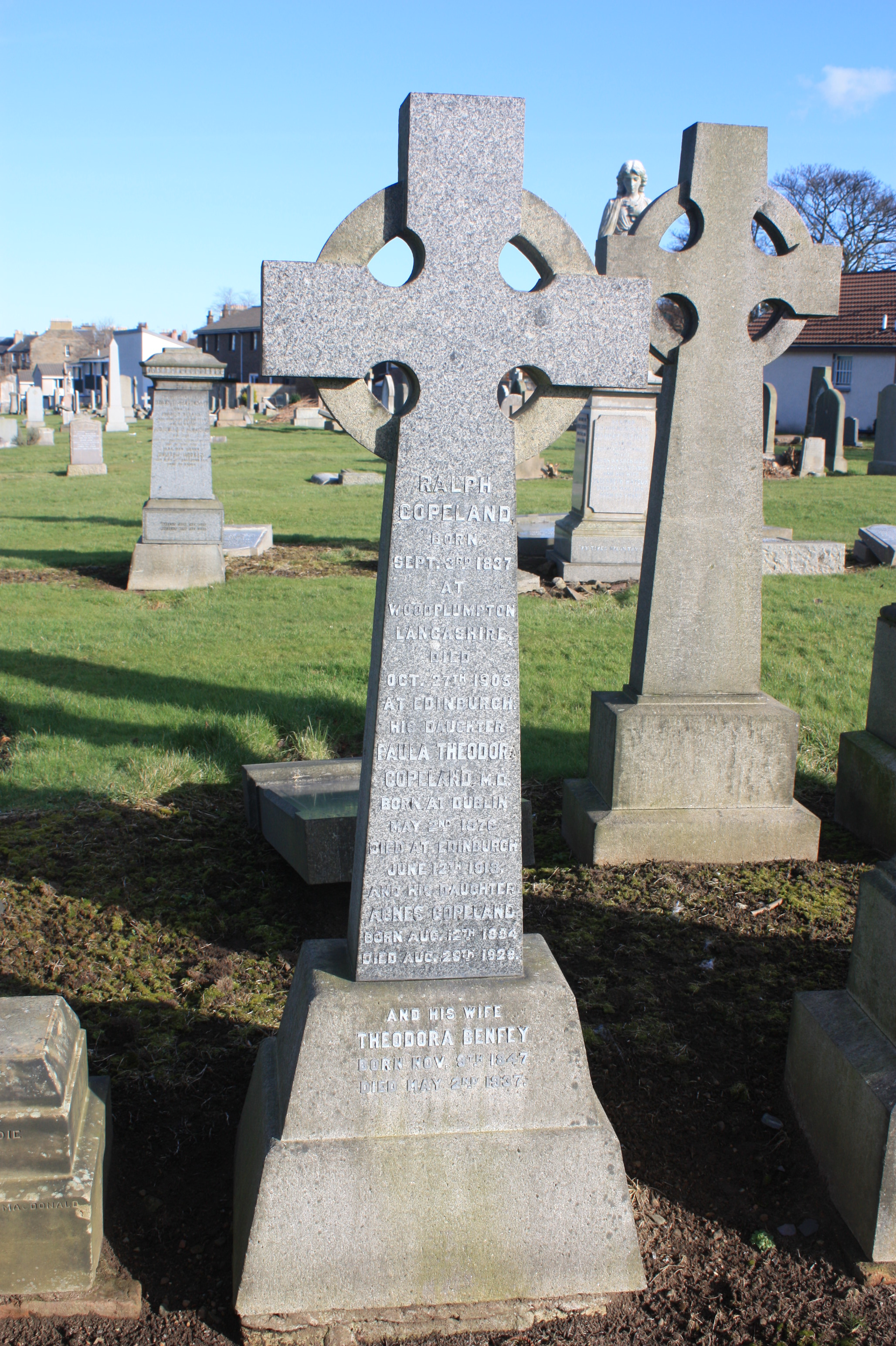
The grave of Ralph Copeland, Morningside Cemetery, Edinburgh

Ralph Copeland FRSE FRAS (3 September 1837 – 27 October 1905) was an English astronomer and the third Astronomer Royal for Scotland.

== Life ==
Copeland was born at Moorside Farm, near Woodplumpton in Lancashire, England the son of Robert Copeland, yeoman, and his wife, Elizabeth Milner, and attended Kirkham Grammar School. He spent five years in Australia where he discovered his interest in astronomy. He returned in 1858 to pursue a career in engineering.

Eager to pursue his astronomical interests, Copeland built a small observatory, gave up engineering, and then travelled to Germany to study astronomy at the University of Göttingen. When he returned to England, as a patron of Lord Rosse, Copeland brought back German methods of astronomy. Later he appointed many German astronomers as assistants, such as Oswald Lohse.

Copeland then worked at the Dun Echt Observatory owned by the 26th Earl of Crawford. Copeland was a frequent traveler on worldwide expeditions and observed the 1874 and 1882 transits of Venus from Mauritius and Jamaica, respectively, and undertook other astronomical observations from Greenland.

On 29 January 1889, Copeland became Astronomer Royal for Scotland, whereupon he first worked at the Calton Hill Observatory, Edinburgh. He was tasked to select a site for a new observatory, eventually choosing Blackford Hill, Edinburgh. Lord Crawford, his former benefactor, donated the astronomical collection from Dun Echt to the new site, which was opened in 1896.

He was elected a Fellow of the Royal Society of Edinburgh in 1889, his proposers were John McLaren, Lord McLaren, Alexander Forbes Irvine, Alexander Buchan and P.G. Tait. He served as the society's vice president 1892–96 and 1898–1903.

Copeland discovered 35 NGC objects, most of them with Lord Rosse's 72" reflector. Planetary nebulae were found by visual spectroscopy at Dun Echt and during an Andes expedition. Seven of the galaxies in the constellation Leo form the famous "Copeland Septet": NGC 3745, 3746, 3748, 3750, 3751, 3753, and 3754.

Copeland was married twice, firstly in 1859 to Susannah Milner, and secondly in 1871 to Theodora Benfey (1847–1937). He had six children, one of whom was Fanny Susan Copeland. They lived on site at the Blackford Hill Observatory.

He was fluent in French, German and Persian.

He died in Edinburgh on 27 October 1905. He was buried in Morningside Cemetery, Edinburgh. He is buried with his second wife, Theodara, and his daughters Paula Theodora Copeland and Agnes Copeland MD. The grave lies in the south-west section of the cemetery.

== Legacy ==
Mount Copeland, in the Monashee Mountains to the northwest of Revelstoke, British Columbia, was named for him in 1909, as was Copeland Ridge (which Mount Copeland is the summit of) and nearby Copeland Creek. Mount Copeland is the site of the highest recorded snowfall in Canada in one season (1 July 1971 – 30 June 1972).

Preceded by Charles Piazzi Smyth	Astronomer Royal for Scotland; 1889–1905	Succeeded by Frank Watson Dyson
