= List of NGC objects (1–1000) =

This is a list of NGC objects 1–1000 from the New General Catalogue (NGC). The astronomical catalogue is composed mainly of star clusters, nebulae, and galaxies. Other objects in the catalogue can be found in the other subpages of the list of NGC objects.

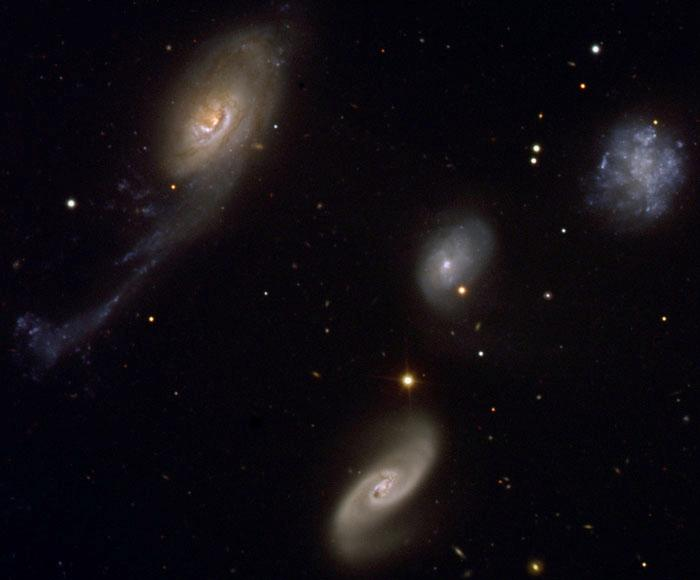
Compact galaxy group Robert's Quartet

The constellation information in these tables is from The Complete New General Catalogue and Index Catalogue of Nebulae and Star Clusters by J. L. E. Dreyer, which was accessed using the VizieR Service. Galaxy morphological types and objects that are members of the Small Magellanic Cloud are identified using the NASA/IPAC Extragalactic Database. The other data of these tables are from the SIMBAD Astronomical Database unless otherwise stated.

== 1–100 ==
NGC number	Image	Other names	Object type	Constellation	Right ascension (J2000)	Declination (J2000)	Apparent magnitude	Note
1			Intermediate spiral galaxy	Pegasus	00^{h} 07^{m} 15.8^{s}	+27° 42′ 29″	13.65	Part of NGC 23 group
2			Spiral galaxy	Pegasus	00^{h} 07^{m} 17.1^{s}	+27° 40′ 42″	14.96	
3			Lenticular galaxy	Pisces	00^{h} 07^{m} 16.8^{s}	+08° 18′ 06″	14.2	
4			Lenticular galaxy	Pisces	00^{h} 07^{m} 24.4^{s}	+08° 22′ 26″	16.8	
5			Elliptical galaxy	Andromeda	00^{h} 07^{m} 48.9^{s}	+35° 21′ 44″	14.33	
6		(Duplicate of NGC 20)	Lenticular galaxy	Andromeda	00^{h} 09^{m} 32.7^{s}	+33° 18′ 31″	14.04	
7			Barred spiral galaxy	Sculptor	00^{h} 08^{m} 20.9^{s}	−29° 54′ 54″	13.47	
8			Double star	Pegasus	00^{h} 08^{m} 45.3^{s}	+23° 50′ 20″	15.2/16.5	
9			Barred spiral galaxy	Pegasus	00^{h} 08^{m} 54.7^{s}	+23° 49′ 02″	14.5	
10			Spiral galaxy	Sculptor	00^{h} 08^{m} 34.5^{s}	−33° 51′ 31″	13	
11			Spiral galaxy	Andromeda	00^{h} 08^{m} 42.5^{s}	+37° 26′ 52″	14.5	
12			Intermediate spiral galaxy	Pisces	00^{h} 08^{m} 44.8^{s}	+04° 36′ 45″	14.5	
13			Spiral galaxy	Andromeda	00^{h} 08^{m} 47.8^{s}	+33° 25′ 58″	14.2	Part of NGC 7831 Group
14			Irregular galaxy	Pegasus	00^{h} 08^{m} 46.4^{s}	+15° 48′ 59″	13.3	
15			Spiral galaxy	Pegasus	00^{h} 09^{m} 02.5^{s}	+21° 37′ 27″	14.9	
16			Lenticular galaxy	Pegasus	00^{h} 09^{m} 04.3^{s}	+27° 43′ 45″	13.0	
17		Also listed as NGC 34	Spiral galaxy	Cetus	00^{h} 11^{m} 06.60^{s}	−12° 06′ 26″	14.0	
18			Double star	Pegasus	00^{h} 09^{m} 23.1^{s}	+27° 43′ 55″	14.0	
19			Spiral galaxy	Andromeda	00^{h} 10^{m} 40.9^{s}	+32° 58′ 59″	14.0	
20		Also listed as NGC 6	Lenticular galaxy	Andromeda	00^{h} 09^{m} 32.8^{s}	+33° 18′ 31″	14.5	Part of NGC 7831 Group
21		Also listed as NGC 29	Spiral galaxy	Andromeda	00^{h} 10^{m} 41.0^{s}	+32° 58′ 57″	13.9	
22			Spiral galaxy	Pegasus	00^{h} 09^{m} 48.3^{s}	+27° 49′ 56″	14.9	
23			Barred spiral galaxy	Pegasus	00^{h} 09^{m} 53.4^{s}	+25° 55′ 27″	12.5	
24			Spiral galaxy	Sculptor	00^{h} 09^{m} 56.5^{s}	−24° 57′ 48″	12.1	
25			Lenticular galaxy	Phoenix	00^{h} 10^{m} 00.8^{s}	−57° 01′ 07″	15.5	
26			Spiral galaxy	Pegasus	00^{h} 10^{m} 26.1^{s}	+25° 49′ 55″	13.9	
27			Spiral galaxy	Andromeda	00^{h} 10^{m} 32.8^{s}	+28° 59′ 47″	14.5	
28			Elliptical galaxy	Phoenix	00^{h} 10^{m} 25.1^{s}	−56° 59′ 23″	13.8	
29		(Duplicate of NGC 21)	Spiral galaxy	Andromeda	00^{h} 10^{m} 47.1^{s}	+33° 21′ 09″	14.5	
30			Double star	Pegasus	00^{h} 11^{m}	+21° 57′	14.8/15	
31			Barred spiral galaxy	Phoenix	00^{h} 10^{m} 38.5^{s}	−56° 59′ 11″	13.9	
32			Asterism	Pegasus	00^{h} 11^{m}	+18° 47′	14	
33			Double star	Pisces	00^{h} 11^{m}	+03° 40′	15	
34		(Duplicate of NGC 17)	Spiral galaxy	Cetus	00^{h} 11^{m} 06.6^{s}	−12° 06′ 26″	14.0	
35			Barred spiral galaxy	Cetus	00^{h} 11^{m} 10.5^{s}	−12° 01′ 15″	14	
36			Barred spiral galaxy	Pisces	00^{h} 11^{m} 22.5^{s}	+06° 23′ 21″	14.5	
37			Lenticular galaxy	Phoenix	00^{h} 11^{m} 22.7^{s}	−56° 57′ 22″	13.7	
38			Spiral galaxy	Pisces	00^{h} 11^{m} 47.0^{s}	−05° 35′ 09″	13.5	
39			Spiral galaxy	Andromeda	00^{h} 12^{m} 19.0^{s}	+31° 03′ 40″	14.4	
40		Bow-Tie Nebula	Planetary nebula	Cepheus	00^{h} 13^{m} 01.0^{s}	+72° 31′ 19″	11.7	
41			Spiral galaxy	Pegasus	00^{h} 12^{m} 48.0^{s}	+22° 01′ 26″	14.6	
42			Lenticular galaxy	Pegasus	00^{h} 12^{m} 56.4^{s}	+22° 05′ 60″	15.0	
43			Lenticular galaxy	Andromeda	00^{h} 13^{m} 01.0^{s}	+30° 54′ 55″	13.9	
44			Double star	Andromeda	00^{h} 13^{m}	+31° 18′	14.6	
45			Irregular galaxy	Cetus	00^{h} 14^{m} 04.0^{s}	−23° 10′ 51″	11.2	
46			Star	Pisces	00^{h} 14^{m}	+05° 59′	11.8	
47			Barred spiral galaxy	Cetus	00^{h} 14^{m} 30.6^{s}	−07° 10′ 03″	13	
48			Barred spiral galaxy	Andromeda	00^{h} 14^{m} 02.3^{s}	+48° 14′ 4″	15.0	
49			Lenticular galaxy	Andromeda	00^{h} 14^{m} 22.5^{s}	+48° 14′ 47″	15.3	
50			Lenticular galaxy	Cetus	00^{h} 14^{m} 44.7^{s}	−07° 20′ 42″	12	
51			Lenticular galaxy	Andromeda	00^{h} 14^{m} 35.0^{s}	+48° 15′ 20″	14.6	
52			Spiral galaxy	Pegasus	00^{h} 14^{m} 40.3^{s}	+18° 34′ 55″	14.6	
53			Barred spiral galaxy	Tucana	00^{h} 14^{m} 42.9^{s}	−60° 19′ 39″	12.6	
54			Spiral galaxy	Cetus	00^{h} 15^{m} 07.7^{s}	−07° 06′ 25″	14	
55		The Whale Galaxy	Irregular galaxy	Sculptor	00^{h} 15^{m} 08.4^{s}	−39° 13′ 13″	8.2	
56			Nonexistent	Pisces	00^{h} 15^{m}	+12° 27′	N/A	
57			Elliptical galaxy	Pisces	00^{h} 15^{m} 31.0^{s}	+17° 19′ 41″	13.7	
58		(Duplicate of NGC 47)	Spiral galaxy	Cetus	00^{h} 14^{m} 30.6^{s}	−07° 10′ 03″	13	
59			Lenticular galaxy	Cetus	00^{h} 15^{m} 25.4^{s}	−21° 26′ 42″	13.1	
60			Spiral galaxy	Pisces	00^{h} 15^{m} 58.3^{s}	−00° 18′ 14″	15.4	
61			Interacting galaxies	Pisces	00^{h} 16^{m} 24.3^{s}	−06° 19′ 08″	15	
62			Barred spiral galaxy	Cetus	00^{h} 17^{m} 05.4^{s}	−13° 29′ 15″	14	
63			Spiral galaxy	Pisces	00^{h} 17^{m} 45.6^{s}	+11° 27′ 01″	12.6	
64			Barred spiral galaxy	Cetus	00^{h} 17^{m} 30.3^{s}	−06° 49′ 29″	13.6	
65			Lenticular galaxy	Cetus	00^{h} 18^{m} 58.6^{s}	−22° 52′ 48″	13.9	
66			Barred spiral galaxy	Cetus	00^{h} 19^{m} 04.9^{s}	−22° 56′ 11″	13.5	
67			Elliptical galaxy	Andromeda	00^{h} 18^{m} 14.9^{s}	+30° 03′ 46″	15.7	Part of NGC 68 group
68			Lenticular galaxy	Andromeda	00^{h} 18^{m} 18.5^{s}	+30° 04′ 17″	14.5	Part of NGC 68 group
69			Lenticular galaxy	Andromeda	00^{h} 18^{m} 20.5^{s}	+30° 02′ 24″	15.7	
70			Spiral galaxy	Andromeda	00^{h} 18^{m} 22.6^{s}	+30° 04′ 46″	14.5	Part of NGC 68 group
71			Lenticular galaxy	Andromeda	00^{h} 18^{m} 23.6^{s}	+30° 03′ 47″	14.8	Part of NGC 68 group
72			Barred spiral galaxy	Andromeda	00^{h} 18^{m} 28.4^{s}	+30° 02′ 26″	15.0	Part of NGC 68 group
73			Intermediate spiral galaxy	Cetus	00^{h} 18^{m} 39.0^{s}	−15° 19′ 20″	13	
74			Lenticular galaxy	Andromeda	00^{h} 18^{m} 49.4^{s}	+30° 03′ 42″	16	Part of NGC 68 group
75			Lenticular galaxy	Pisces	00^{h} 19^{m} 26.4^{s}	+06° 26′ 57″	14.8	
76			Lenticular galaxy	Andromeda	00^{h} 19^{m} 37.8^{s}	+29° 56′ 2″	14.0	
77			Lenticular galaxy	Cetus	00^{h} 20^{m} 01.7^{s}	−22° 31′ 56″	14.8	
78			Interacting galaxies	Pisces	00^{h} 20^{m} 27.6^{s}	+00° 49′ 60″	14.5	
79			Elliptical galaxy	Andromeda	00^{h} 21^{m} 02.9^{s}	+22° 33′ 60″	14.9	
80			Lenticular galaxy	Andromeda	00^{h} 21^{m} 11.0^{s}	+22° 21′ 24″	13.7	Part of NGC 80 group
81			Lenticular galaxy	Andromeda	00^{h} 21^{m} 13.2^{s}	+22° 22′ 59″	17.7	
82			Star	Andromeda	00^{h} 21^{m} 17.5^{s}	+22° 27′ 37″	14.6	
83			Elliptical galaxy	Andromeda	00^{h} 21^{m} 22.5^{s}	+22° 26′ 00″	14.2	
84			Star	Andromeda	00^{h} 21^{m} 33.7^{s}	+22° 35′ 35″	15.8	
85			Lenticular galaxy	Andromeda	00^{h} 21^{m} 25.5^{s}	+22° 30′ 42″	15.7	Interacting with galaxy IC 1546
86			Lenticular galaxy	Andromeda	00^{h} 21^{m} 28.7^{s}	+22° 33′ 23″	14.9	
87			Irregular galaxy	Phoenix	00^{h} 21^{m} 14.0^{s}	−48° 37′ 42″	14.5	Part of Robert's Quartet
88			Spiral galaxy	Phoenix	00^{h} 21^{m} 21.8^{s}	−48° 38′ 25″	15.2	Part of Robert's Quartet
89			Spiral galaxy	Phoenix	00^{h} 21^{m} 24.4^{s}	−48° 39′ 57″	14.6	Part of Robert's Quartet
90			Spiral galaxy	Andromeda	00^{h} 21^{m} 51.4^{s}	+22° 24′ 00″	13.7	Interacting galaxy NGC 90 and 93 is known as Arp 65
91			Star	Andromeda	00^{h} 21^{m} 51.7^{s}	+22° 22′ 06″	14.4	
92			Spiral galaxy	Phoenix	00^{h} 21^{m} 31.4^{s}	−48° 37′ 28″	14.3	Part of Robert's Quartet
93			Spiral galaxy	Andromeda	00^{h} 22^{m} 03.4^{s}	+22° 24′ 28″	14.7	
94			Lenticular galaxy	Andromeda	00^{h} 22^{m} 13.1^{s}	+22° 28′ 44″	15.6	
95			Spiral galaxy	Pisces	00^{h} 22^{m} 13.7^{s}	+10° 29′ 29″	13.4	
96			Lenticular galaxy	Andromeda	00^{h} 22^{m} 17.8^{s}	+22° 32′ 48″	17	
97			Elliptical galaxy	Andromeda	00^{h} 22^{m} 30.1^{s}	+29° 44′ 43″	13.5	Part of NGC 108 Group
98			Barred spiral galaxy	Phoenix	00^{h} 22^{m} 49.5^{s}	−45° 16′ 09″	12.8	
99			Spiral galaxy	Pisces	00^{h} 23^{m} 59.5^{s}	+15° 46′ 14″	14.0	
100			Spiral galaxy	Pisces	00^{h} 24^{m} 02.8^{s}	+16° 29′ 10″	14.6	

== 101–200 ==
NGC number	Image	Other names	Object type	Constellation	Right ascension (J2000)	Declination (J2000)	Apparent magnitude	Note
101			Spiral galaxy	Sculptor	00^{h} 23^{m} 54.6^{s}	−32° 32′ 09″	12.8	
102			Lenticular galaxy	Cetus	00^{h} 24^{m} 36.5^{s}	−13° 57′ 22″	14	
103			Open cluster	Cassiopeia	00^{h} 25^{m}	+61° 21′	10.3	
104		47 Tucanae	Globular cluster	Tucana	00^{h} 24^{m} 05.7^{s}	−72° 04′ 53″	5.8	
105			Spiral galaxy	Pisces	00^{h} 25^{m} 16.9^{s}	+12° 53′ 01″	14.1	
106			Lenticular galaxy	Pisces	00^{h} 24^{m} 43.8^{s}	−05° 08′ 55″	14.5	
107			Spiral galaxy	Cetus	00^{h} 25^{m} 42.1^{s}	−08° 16′ 58″	15.7	
108			Lenticular galaxy	Andromeda	00^{h} 25^{m} 59.8^{s}	+29° 12′ 42″	13.3	
109			Spiral galaxy	Andromeda	00^{h} 26^{m} 14.7^{s}	+21° 48′ 25″	15.0	
110			Open cluster	Cassiopeia	00^{h} 27^{m}	+71° 24′	9.0	
111			Unknown	Cetus	00^{h} 27^{m}	−02° 38′		
112			Barred spiral galaxy	Andromeda	00^{h} 26^{m} 48.8^{s}	+31° 42′ 12″	14.5	
113			Lenticular galaxy	Cetus	00^{h} 26^{m} 54.6^{s}	−02° 30′ 03″	13.5	
114			Lenticular galaxy	Cetus	00^{h} 26^{m} 58.4^{s}	−01° 47′ 10″	15.0	
115			Barred spiral galaxy	Sculptor	00^{h} 26^{m} 46.6^{s}	−33° 40′ 36″	14	
116			Doesn't exist	Cetus	00^{h} 27^{m} 05.3^{s}	−07° 40′ 05″	14.5	
117			Lenticular galaxy	Cetus	00^{h} 27^{m} 10.9^{s}	+01° 20′ 03″	15.5	
118			Spiral galaxy	Cetus	00^{h} 27^{m} 16.2^{s}	−01° 46′ 48″	14.9	
119			Lenticular galaxy	Phoenix	00^{h} 26^{m} 57.5^{s}	−56° 58′ 42″	13	
120			Lenticular galaxy	Cetus	00^{h} 27^{m} 30.3^{s}	−01° 30′ 49″	14.8	
121			Globular cluster	Tucana	00^{h} 26^{m} 49.0^{s}	−71° 32′ 10″	11.2	
122		Doesn't exist	Unknown	Cetus	00^{h} 28^{m}	−01° 38′		
123		Doesn't exist	Unknown	Cetus	00^{h} 28^{m}	−01° 36′		
124			Spiral galaxy	Cetus	00^{h} 27^{m} 52.5^{s}	−01° 48′ 38″	13.8	
125			Lenticular galaxy	Pisces	00^{h} 28^{m} 50.3^{s}	+02° 50′ 19″	14.2	
126			Lenticular galaxy	Pisces	00^{h} 29^{m} 08.1^{s}	+02° 48′ 40″	14.5	
127			Lenticular galaxy	Pisces	00^{h} 29^{m} 12.4^{s}	+02° 52′ 22″	13.2	
128			Lenticular galaxy	Pisces	00^{h} 29^{m} 15.1^{s}	+02° 51′ 51″	13.2	
129			Open cluster	Cassiopeia	00^{h} 30^{m}	+60° 13′	7.3	
130			Lenticular galaxy	Pisces	00^{h} 29^{m} 18.0^{s}	+02° 52′ 18″	15	
131			Spiral galaxy	Sculptor	00^{h} 29^{m} 38.0^{s}	−33° 15′ 38″	13.5	
132			Spiral galaxy	Cetus	00^{h} 30^{m} 10.7^{s}	+02° 05′ 35″	13.8	
133			Open cluster	Cassiopeia	00^{h} 31^{m} 12^{s}	+63° 22′	9.4	
134			Barred spiral galaxy	Sculptor	00^{h} 30^{m} 21.5^{s}	−33° 14′ 49″	11.0	
135		IC 26	Lenticular galaxy	Cetus	00^{h} 31^{m} 45.6^{s}	−13° 20′ 17″		
136			Open cluster	Cassiopeia	00^{h} 32^{m}	+61° 32′	11.0	
137			Lenticular galaxy	Pisces	00^{h} 30^{m} 58.2^{s}	+10° 12′ 29″	14.2	
138			Spiral galaxy	Pisces	00^{h} 30^{m} 59.4^{s}	+05° 09′ 35″	14.8	
139			Barred spiral galaxy	Pisces	00^{h} 31^{m} 06.4^{s}	+05° 04′ 43″	15.5	
140			Spiral galaxy	Andromeda	00^{h} 31^{m} 20.6^{s}	+30° 47′ 33″	14.2	
141			Spiral galaxy	Pisces	00^{h} 31^{m} 19.0^{s}	+05° 10′ 52″	15.4	
142			Spiral galaxy	Cetus	00^{h} 31^{m} 07.9^{s}	−22° 37′ 07″		
143			Spiral galaxy	Cetus	00^{h} 31^{m} 15.5^{s}	−22° 33′ 37″		
144			Spiral galaxy	Cetus	00^{h} 31^{m} 20.7^{s}	−22° 38′ 47″		
145			Barred spiral galaxy	Cetus	00^{h} 31^{m} 45.0^{s}	−05° 09′ 11″	12	
146			Open cluster	Cassiopeia	00^{h} 33^{m}	+63° 18′	9.6	
147			Elliptical galaxy	Cassiopeia	00^{h} 33^{m} 11.8^{s}	+48° 30′ 25″	12.0	
148			Lenticular galaxy	Sculptor	00^{h} 34^{m} 15.6^{s}	−31° 47′ 07″	13.1	
149			Lenticular galaxy	Andromeda	00^{h} 33^{m} 50.4^{s}	+30° 43′ 23″	15.0	
150			Barred spiral galaxy	Sculptor	00^{h} 34^{m} 16.1^{s}	−27° 48′ 16″	11.8	
151			Barred spiral galaxy	Cetus	00^{h} 34^{m} 02.8^{s}	−09° 42′ 19″	12.2	
152			Open cluster	Tucana	00^{h} 32^{m} 56.3^{s}	−73° 06′ 57″	13.1	
153		(Duplicate of NGC 151)	Spiral galaxy	Cetus	00^{h} 34^{m} 02.8^{s}	−09° 42′ 19″	12.2	
154			Elliptical galaxy	Cetus	00^{h} 34^{m} 19.5^{s}	−12° 39′ 23″	14	
155			Lenticular galaxy	Cetus	00^{h} 34^{m} 40.1^{s}	−10° 45′ 60″	13	
156			Double star	Cetus	00^{h} 35^{m}	−08° 21′		
157			Intermediate spiral galaxy	Cetus	00^{h} 34^{m} 46.7^{s}	−08° 23′ 48″	10	
158			Possible double star	Cetus	00^{h} 35^{m}	−08° 19′		
159			Lenticular galaxy	Phoenix	00^{h} 34^{m} 35.5^{s}	−55° 47′ 26″		
160			Lenticular galaxy	Andromeda	00^{h} 36^{m} 04.1^{s}	+23° 57′ 31″	13.7	
161			Lenticular galaxy	Cetus	00^{h} 35^{m} 33.9^{s}	−02° 50′ 55″	15	
162		UCAC2 4012415	Star	Andromeda	00^{h} 35^{m} 58.0^{s}	+24° 02′ 16″	16.0	
163			Elliptical galaxy	Cetus	00^{h} 35^{m} 59.8^{s}	−10° 07′ 18″	13	
164			Spiral galaxy	Pisces	00^{h} 36^{m} 33.0^{s}	+02° 44′ 58″	16	
165			Spiral galaxy	Cetus	00^{h} 36^{m} 28.7^{s}	−10° 06′ 18″	13	
166			Spiral galaxy	Cetus	00^{h} 35^{m} 48.8^{s}	−13° 36′ 40″	15	
167			Spiral galaxy	Cetus	00^{h} 35^{m} 23.0^{s}	−23° 22′ 28″	13.98	
168			Lenticular galaxy	Cetus	00^{h} 36^{m} 38.6^{s}	−22° 35′ 35″	14.9	
169			Barred spiral galaxy	Andromeda	00^{h} 36^{m} 51.7^{s}	+23° 59′ 28″	13.7	
170			Lenticular galaxy	Cetus	00^{h} 36^{m} 45.9^{s}	+01° 53′ 11″	15.5	
171			Barred spiral galaxy	Cetus	00^{h} 37^{m} 21.9^{s}	−19° 56′ 12″	12	
172			Barred spiral galaxy	Cetus	00^{h} 37^{m} 13.5^{s}	−22° 35′ 12″	14.7	
173			Spiral galaxy	Cetus	00^{h} 37^{m} 12.6^{s}	+01° 56′ 31″	14.5	
174			Barred spiral galaxy	Sculptor	00^{h} 36^{m} 58.8^{s}	−29° 28′ 42″	13.5	
175		(Duplicate of NGC 171)	Barred spiral galaxy	Cetus	00^{h} 37^{m} 21.9^{s}	−19° 56′ 12″	12	
176			Open cluster	Tucana	00^{h} 35^{m} 58.7^{s}	−73° 09′ 57″	13.1	
177			Spiral galaxy	Cetus	00^{h} 37^{m} 34.3^{s}	−22° 32′ 58″	14.2	
178		IC 39	Magellanic spiral	Cetus	00^{h} 39^{m} 08.4^{s}	−14° 10′ 17″	13.0	
179			Lenticular galaxy	Cetus	00^{h} 37^{m} 46.3^{s}	−17° 51′ 00″	14.30	
180			Barred spiral galaxy	Pisces	00^{h} 37^{m} 57.8^{s}	+08° 38′ 04″	14.3	
181			Spiral galaxy	Andromeda	00^{h} 38^{m} 23.2^{s}	+29° 28′ 22″	15.4	
182			Spiral galaxy	Pisces	00^{h} 38^{m} 12.5^{s}	+02° 43′ 42″	13.8	
183			Elliptical galaxy	Andromeda	00^{h} 38^{m} 29.5^{s}	+29° 30′ 40″	13.8	
184			Spiral galaxy	Andromeda	00^{h} 38^{m} 35.8^{s}	+29° 26′ 51″	15.5	
185			Dwarf spheroidal galaxy	Cassiopeia	00^{h} 38^{m} 57.4^{s}	+48° 20′ 14″	11.0	
186			Lenticular galaxy	Pisces	00^{h} 38^{m} 25.3^{s}	+03° 09′ 58″	14.8	
187			Barred spiral galaxy	Cetus	00^{h} 39^{m} 30.4^{s}	−14° 39′ 17″	13	
188			Open cluster	Cepheus	00^{h} 48^{m} 26^{s}	+85° 15′	8.9	
189			Open cluster	Cassiopeia	00^{h} 40^{m}	+61° 04′	9.1	
190			Interacting galaxies	Pisces	00^{h} 38^{m} 54.8^{s}	+07° 03′ 45″	15.1	
191			Spiral galaxy	Cetus	00^{h} 38^{m} 59.3^{s}	−09° 00′ 09″	12	
192			Spiral galaxy	Cetus	00^{h} 39^{m} 13.5^{s}	+00° 51′ 49″	13.9	
193			Lenticular galaxy	Pisces	00^{h} 39^{m} 18.7^{s}	+03° 19′ 53″	13.2	
194			Elliptical galaxy	Pisces	00^{h} 39^{m} 18.5^{s}	+03° 02′ 14″	13.9	
195			Spiral galaxy	Cetus	00^{h} 39^{m} 35.8^{s}	−09° 11′ 40″	14	
196			Lenticular galaxy	Cetus	00^{h} 39^{m} 17.9^{s}	+00° 54′ 45″	14.2	
197			Lenticular galaxy	Cetus	00^{h} 39^{m} 18.9^{s}	+00° 53′ 30″	14.2	
198			Spiral galaxy	Pisces	00^{h} 39^{m} 23.1^{s}	+02° 47′ 51″	14.1	
199			Lenticular galaxy	Pisces	00^{h} 39^{m} 33.3^{s}	+03° 08′ 19″	15.0	
200			Spiral galaxy	Pisces	00^{h} 39^{m} 34.9^{s}	+02° 53′ 14″	14.0	

== 201–300 ==
NGC number	Image	Other names	Object type	Constellation	Right ascension (J2000)	Declination (J2000)	Apparent magnitude	Note
201			Spiral galaxy	Cetus	00^{h} 39^{m} 34.9^{s}	+00° 51′ 35″	14.7	
202			Lenticular galaxy	Pisces	00^{h} 39^{m} 40.0^{s}	+03° 32′ 10″	15.5	
203		Also known as NGC 211	Lenticular galaxy	Pisces	00^{h} 39^{m} 39.5^{s}	+03° 26′ 34″	14.5	
204			Lenticular galaxy	Pisces	00^{h} 39^{m} 44.3^{s}	+03° 17′ 58″	14.6	
205		Messier 110	Dwarf elliptical galaxy	Andromeda	00^{h} 40^{m} 22.0^{s}	+41° 41′ 07″	9.4	
206			Star cloud	Andromeda	00^{h} 40^{m} 33.8^{s}	+40° 44′ 22″		
207			Spiral galaxy	Cetus	00^{h} 39^{m} 40.8^{s}	−14° 14′ 15″	14.8	
208			Spiral galaxy	Pisces	00^{h} 40^{m} 17.6^{s}	+02° 45′ 22″	15.5	
209			Lenticular galaxy	Cetus	00^{h} 39^{m} 03.6^{s}	−18° 36′ 30″	14.0	
210			Barred spiral galaxy	Cetus	00^{h} 40^{m} 35.1^{s}	−13° 52′ 26″	11	
211		(Duplicate of NGC 203)	Lenticular galaxy	Pisces	00^{h} 39^{m} 39.5^{s}	+03° 26′ 34″	14.5	
212			Lenticular galaxy	Phoenix	00^{h} 40^{m} 13.3^{s}	−56° 09′ 11″	14.39	
213			Spiral galaxy	Pisces	00^{h} 41^{m} 10.1^{s}	+16° 28′ 08″	14.8	
214			Spiral galaxy	Andromeda	00^{h} 41^{m} 27.9^{s}	+25° 30′ 01″	13.0	
215			Lenticular galaxy	Phoenix	00^{h} 40^{m} 48.9^{s}	−56° 12′ 51″	14.05	
216			Lenticular galaxy	Cetus	00^{h} 41^{m} 26.5^{s}	−21° 02′ 43″	13.6	
217			Spiral galaxy	Cetus	00^{h} 41^{m} 33.8^{s}	−10° 01′ 19″	13	
218			Spiral galaxy	Andromeda	00^{h} 41^{m} 44.7^{s}	+36° 21′ 34″	15.5	
219			Elliptical galaxy	Cetus	00^{h} 42^{m} 11.3^{s}	+00° 54′ 16″	15.6	
220		(Located in Small Magellanic Cloud)	Open cluster	Tucana	00^{h} 40^{m} 30.5^{s}	−73° 24′ 10″	14.6	
221		Messier 32	Elliptical galaxy	Andromeda	00^{h} 42^{m} 41.9^{s}	+40° 51′ 57″	9.2	
222		(Located in Small Magellanic Cloud)	Open cluster	Tucana	00^{h} 40^{m} 44.1^{s}	−73° 23′ 00″	12.8	
223			Spiral galaxy	Cetus	00^{h} 42^{m} 15.9^{s}	+00° 50′ 44″	14.5	
224		Messier 31; Andromeda Galaxy	Barred spiral galaxy	Andromeda	00^{h} 42^{m} 44.3^{s}	+41° 16′ 09″	4.3	
225			Open cluster	Cassiopeia	00^{h} 44^{m}	+61° 47′	7.4	
226			Spiral galaxy	Andromeda	00^{h} 42^{m} 54.3^{s}	+32° 34′ 49″	14.4	
227			Lenticular galaxy	Cetus	00^{h} 42^{m} 37.0^{s}	−01° 31′ 44″	13.4	
228			Spiral galaxy	Andromeda	00^{h} 42^{m} 54.5^{s}	+23° 30′ 12″	14.9	
229			Lenticular galaxy	Andromeda	00^{h} 43^{m} 04.7^{s}	+23° 30′ 33″	14.7	
230			Spiral galaxy	Cetus	00^{h} 42^{m} 27.1^{s}	−23° 37′ 45″	15.36	
231		(Located in Small Magellanic Cloud)	Open cluster	Tucana	00^{h} 41^{m} 06.2^{s}	−73° 21′ 07″	13.1	
232			Spiral galaxy	Cetus	00^{h} 42^{m} 45.6^{s}	−23° 33′ 39″	14.4	
233			Elliptical galaxy	Andromeda	00^{h} 43^{m} 36.8^{s}	+30° 35′ 12″	13.8	
234			Spiral galaxy	Pisces	00^{h} 43^{m} 32.4^{s}	+14° 20′ 33″	13.5	
235			Interacting galaxies	Cetus	00^{h} 42^{m} 52.5^{s}	−23° 32′ 28″	14	
236			Spiral galaxy	Pisces	00^{h} 43^{m} 27.6^{s}	+02° 57′ 28″	14.5	
237			Spiral galaxy	Cetus	00^{h} 43^{m} 27.9^{s}	−00° 07′ 32″	13.6	
238			Spiral galaxy	Phoenix	00^{h} 43^{m} 25.8^{s}	−50° 10′ 58″	13.1	
239			Spiral galaxy	Cetus	00^{h} 44^{m} 37.5^{s}	−03° 45′ 34″	14	
240			Spiral galaxy	Pisces	00^{h} 45^{m} 02.0^{s}	+06° 06′ 47″	14.8	
241		(Located in Small Magellanic Cloud)	Open cluster	Tucana	00^{h} 43^{m} 32.7^{s}	−73° 26′ 25″		
242		(Located in Small Magellanic Cloud)	Open cluster	Tucana	00^{h} 43^{m} 37.6^{s}	−73° 26′ 38″	12.1	
243			Lenticular galaxy	Andromeda	00^{h} 46^{m} 00.7^{s}	+29° 57′ 34″	14.6	
244			Lenticular galaxy	Cetus	00^{h} 45^{m} 46.5^{s}	−15° 35′ 51″	13	
245			Spiral galaxy	Cetus	00^{h} 46^{m} 05.6^{s}	−01° 43′ 24″	12.9	
246			Planetary nebula	Cetus	00^{h} 47^{m} 03.3^{s}	−11° 52′ 19″	11.4	
247			Intermediate spiral galaxy	Cetus	00^{h} 47^{m} 08.6^{s}	−20° 45′ 38″	9.6	
248		(Located in Small Magellanic Cloud)	Diffuse nebula	Tucana	00^{h} 46^{m} 19.6^{s}	−73° 23′ 21″		
249		(Located in Small Magellanic Cloud)	Diffuse nebula	Tucana	00^{h} 45^{m} 10.9^{s}	−73° 04′ 17″	15.0	
250			Lenticular galaxy	Pisces	00^{h} 47^{m} 16.1^{s}	+07° 54′ 36″	14.9	
251			Spiral galaxy	Pisces	00^{h} 47^{m} 54.0^{s}	+19° 35′ 48″	14.6	
252			Lenticular galaxy	Andromeda	00^{h} 48^{m} 01.5^{s}	+27° 37′ 29″	13.5	
253		Sculptor Galaxy	Intermediate spiral galaxy	Sculptor	00^{h} 47^{m} 33.1^{s}	−25° 17′ 18″	8.0	
254			Lenticular galaxy	Sculptor	00^{h} 47^{m} 27.5^{s}	−31° 25′ 19″	12.7	
255			Barred spiral galaxy	Cetus	00^{h} 47^{m} 47.2^{s}	−11° 28′ 05″	11	
256		(Located in Small Magellanic Cloud)	Open cluster	Tucana	00^{h} 45^{m} 54.3^{s}	−73° 30′ 24″	12.8	
257			Spiral galaxy	Pisces	00^{h} 48^{m} 01.6^{s}	+08° 17′ 48″	13.7	
258			Lenticular galaxy	Andromeda	00^{h} 48^{m} 12.8^{s}	+27° 39′ 26″	15	
259			Spiral galaxy	Cetus	00^{h} 48^{m} 03.3^{s}	−02° 46′ 34″	12.5	
260			Spiral galaxy	Andromeda	00^{h} 48^{m} 34.9^{s}	+27° 41′ 30″	14.3	
261		(Located in Small Magellanic Cloud)	Diffuse nebula	Tucana	00^{h} 46^{m} 33.0^{s}	−73° 05′ 55″		
262			Spiral galaxy	Andromeda	00^{h} 48^{m} 47.1^{s}	+31° 57′ 25″	15.0	
263			Spiral galaxy	Cetus	00^{h} 48^{m} 48.4^{s}	−13° 06′ 28″	14	
264			Lenticular galaxy	Sculptor	00^{h} 48^{m} 21.1^{s}	−38° 14′ 05″	14.9	
265		(Located in Small Magellanic Cloud)	Open cluster	Tucana	00^{h} 47^{m} 11.6^{s}	−73° 28′ 38″	12.5	
266			Barred spiral galaxy	Pisces	00^{h} 49^{m} 48.0^{s}	+32° 16′ 39″	12.6	
267		(Located in Small Magellanic Cloud)	Diffuse nebula	Tucana	00^{h} 48^{m} 37.6^{s}	−73° 18′ 59″		
268			Spiral galaxy	Cetus	00^{h} 50^{m} 09.4^{s}	−05° 11′ 37″	12.5	
269		(Located in Small Magellanic Cloud)	Open cluster	Tucana	00^{h} 48^{m} 21.2^{s}	−73° 31′ 49″	13.0	
270			Lenticular galaxy	Cetus	00^{h} 50^{m} 32.4^{s}	−08° 39′ 05″	13	
271			Barred spiral galaxy	Cetus	00^{h} 50^{m} 41.9^{s}	−01° 54′ 37″	13.2	
272			Open cluster	Andromeda	00^{h} 51^{m}	+35° 50′	8.5	
273			Lenticular galaxy	Cetus	00^{h} 50^{m} 48.5^{s}	−06° 53′ 08″	13	
274			Lenticular galaxy	Cetus	00^{h} 51^{m} 01.9^{s}	−07° 03′ 26″	13	
275			Barred spiral galaxy	Cetus	00^{h} 51^{m} 04.4^{s}	−07° 03′ 56″	13	
276			Barred spiral galaxy	Cetus	00^{h} 52^{m} 06.4^{s}	−22° 40′ 50″	15.7	
277			Lenticular galaxy	Cetus	00^{h} 51^{m} 17.2^{s}	−08° 35′ 48″	13	
278			Spiral galaxy	Cassiopeia	00^{h} 52^{m} 04.4^{s}	+47° 33′ 01″	10.5	
279			Lenticular galaxy	Cetus	00^{h} 52^{m} 09.0^{s}	−02° 13′ 07″	14.0	
280			Spiral galaxy	Andromeda	00^{h} 52^{m} 30.3^{s}	+24° 21′ 04″	14.6	
281			Diffuse nebula and star cluster	Cassiopeia	00^{h} 52^{m} 25.1^{s}	+56° 33′ 54″	7.3	
282			Elliptical galaxy	Pisces	00^{h} 52^{m} 42.2^{s}	+30° 38′ 21″	14.7	
283			Spiral galaxy	Cetus	00^{h} 53^{m} 13.2^{s}	−13° 09′ 50″	14	
284			Elliptical galaxy	Cetus	00^{h} 54^{m}	−13° 09′	15	
285			Lenticular galaxy	Cetus	00^{h} 53^{m} 29.8^{s}	−13° 09′ 39″	14.9	
286			Lenticular galaxy	Cetus	00^{h} 53^{m} 30.4^{s}	−13° 06′ 46″	14	
287			Lenticular galaxy	Pisces	00^{h} 53^{m} 28.3^{s}	+32° 28′ 56″	14.8	
288			Globular cluster	Sculptor	00^{h} 52^{m} 45.3^{s}	−26° 34′ 43″	10	
289			Spiral galaxy	Sculptor	00^{h} 52^{m} 41.7^{s}	−31° 12′ 28″	11.6	
290		(Located in Small Magellanic Cloud)	Open cluster	Tucana	00^{h} 51^{m} 14.1^{s}	−73° 09′ 42″	12.1	
291			Barred spiral galaxy	Cetus	00^{h} 53^{m} 29.8^{s}	−08° 46′ 04″	14	
292		Small Magellanic Cloud	Irregular galaxy	Tucana	00^{h} 52^{m} 38.0^{s}	−72° 48′ 01″	2.8	
293			Spiral galaxy	Cetus	00^{h} 54^{m} 16.0^{s}	−07° 14′ 09″	14	
294		(Located in Small Magellanic Cloud)	Open cluster	Tucana	00^{h} 53^{m} 05.6^{s}	−73° 22′ 49″	12.7	
295			Unknown	Pisces	00^{h} 55^{m} 07.7^{s}	+31° 32′ 32″	13.5	
296		(Sometimes mistakenly identified as NGC 295)	Spiral galaxy	Pisces	00^{h} 55^{m} 21.7^{s}	+31° 40′ 37″	15.4	
297			Elliptical galaxy	Cetus	00^{h} 54^{m} 58.9^{s}	−07° 20′ 58.8″	17.3	
298			Spiral galaxy	Cetus	00^{h} 55^{m} 02.3^{s}	−07° 19′ 57″	13.5	
299			Open cluster	Tucana	00^{h} 53^{m} 24.7^{s}	−72° 11′ 48″	12.1	
300			Spiral galaxy	Sculptor	00^{h} 54^{m} 53.5^{s}	−37° 40′ 59″	8.7	

== 301–400 ==
NGC number	Image	Other names	Object type	Constellation	Right ascension (J2000)	Declination (J2000)	Apparent magnitude	Note
301			Spiral galaxy	Cetus	00^{h} 56^{m} 18.3^{s}	−10° 40′ 25″	15.5	
302			Star	Cetus	00^{h} 56^{m}	−10° 39′	16.6g	
303			Lenticular galaxy	Cetus	00^{h} 54^{m} 54.9^{s}	−16° 39′ 14″	15.5	
304			Lenticular galaxy	Andromeda	00^{h} 56^{m} 06.1^{s}	+24° 07′ 39″	14.0	
305			Asterism	Pisces	00^{h} 55^{m} 58.7^{s}	+12° 07′ 25″	15.4	
306			Open cluster	Tucana	00^{h} 54^{m} 14.3^{s}	−72° 14′ 27″	12.2	
307			Lenticular galaxy	Cetus	00^{h} 56^{m} 32.6^{s}	−01° 46′ 20″	14.1	
308		UCAC2 31096253	Star	Cetus	00^{h} 56^{m} 22.4^{s}	−01° 46′ 45″		
309			Spiral galaxy	Cetus	00^{h} 56^{m} 42.7^{s}	−09° 54′ 50″	12	
310			Star	Cetus	00^{h} 57^{m}	−01° 46′		
311			Lenticular galaxy	Pisces	00^{h} 57^{m} 32.8^{s}	+30° 16′ 50″	14.1	
312			Elliptical galaxy	Phoenix	00^{h} 56^{m} 15.7^{s}	−52° 46′ 59″		
313			Triple star	Pisces	00^{h} 58^{m}	+30° 21′		
314			Lenticular galaxy	Sculptor	00^{h} 56^{m} 52.4^{s}	−31° 57′ 45″	14.5	
315			Elliptical galaxy	Pisces	00^{h} 57^{m} 48.9^{s}	+30° 21′ 09″	12.5	
316			Star	Pisces	00^{h} 58^{m}	+30° 21′		
317			Interacting galaxies	Andromeda	00^{h} 57^{m} 40.5^{s}	+43° 47′ 31″	14.5	
318			Lenticular galaxy	Pisces	00^{h} 58^{m} 05.2^{s}	+30° 25′ 32″	15.2	
319			Spiral galaxy	Phoenix	00^{h} 56^{m} 57.5^{s}	−43° 50′ 22″	15	
320			Spiral galaxy	Cetus	00^{h} 58^{m} 46.3^{s}	−20° 50′ 25″	15.0	
321			Elliptical galaxy	Cetus	00^{h} 57^{m} 39.2^{s}	−05° 05′ 10″	16	
322			Lenticular galaxy	Phoenix	00^{h} 57^{m} 09.8^{s}	−43° 43′ 38″	14.1	
323			Elliptical galaxy	Phoenix	00^{h} 56^{m} 41.4^{s}	−52° 58′ 35″	13.59	
324			Lenticular galaxy	Phoenix	00^{h} 57^{m} 14.7^{s}	−40° 57′ 29″	13.5	
325			Spiral galaxy	Cetus	00^{h} 57^{m} 47.8^{s}	−05° 06′ 45″	15	
326			Dumbbell galaxy	Pisces	00^{h} 58^{m} 22.7^{s}	+26° 51′ 57″	14.9	
327			Spiral galaxy	Cetus	00^{h} 57^{m} 55.3^{s}	−05° 07′ 50″	13	
328			Spiral galaxy	Phoenix	00^{h} 56^{m} 57.5^{s}	−52° 55′ 27″	14.24	
329			Spiral galaxy	Cetus	00^{h} 58^{m} 01.5^{s}	−05° 04′ 17″	13	
330		(Located in Small Magellanic Cloud)	Globular cluster	Tucana	00^{h} 56^{m} 18.7^{s}	−72° 27′ 50″	9.8	
331			Barred spiral galaxy	Cetus	00^{h} 57^{m} 03.8^{s}	−02° 45′ 27″	15.2	
332			Lenticular galaxy	Pisces	00^{h} 58^{m} 49.2^{s}	+07° 06′ 40″	14.9	
333			Interacting galaxies	Cetus	00^{h} 58^{m} 51.3^{s}	−16° 28′ 08″	13.9	
334			Barred spiral galaxy	Sculptor	00^{h} 58^{m} 49.8^{s}	−35° 06′ 54″	14	
335			Spiral galaxy	Cetus	00^{h} 59^{m} 19.8^{s}	−18° 14′ 05″	15.8	
336			Spiral galaxy	Cetus	00^{h} 58^{m} 58.1^{s}	−18° 44′ 37″		
337			Barred spiral galaxy	Cetus	00^{h} 59^{m} 50.2^{s}	−07° 34′ 33″	11	
338			Spiral galaxy	Pisces	01^{h} 00^{m} 36.6^{s}	+30° 40′ 08″	14.0	
339		(Located in Small Magellanic Cloud)	Globular cluster	Tucana	00^{h} 57^{m} 48.9^{s}	−74° 28′ 00″	12.0	
340			Spiral galaxy	Cetus	01^{h} 00^{m} 34.9^{s}	−06° 52′ 00″	14	
341			Spiral galaxy	Cetus	01^{h} 00^{m} 45.7^{s}	−09° 11′ 08″	15.5	
342			Lenticular galaxy	Cetus	01^{h} 00^{m} 49.9^{s}	−06° 46′ 21″	14.5	
343			Interacting galaxies	Cetus	00^{h} 58^{m} 23.9^{s}	−23° 13′ 31″		
344			Barred spiral galaxy	Cetus	01^{h} 01^{m} 35.5^{s}	−23° 15′ 53″		
345			Spiral galaxy	Cetus	01^{h} 01^{m} 22.1^{s}	−06° 53′ 04″	13.5	
346		(Located in Small Magellanic Cloud)	Open cluster	Tucana	00^{h} 59^{m} 18^{s}	−72° 11′		
347			Spiral galaxy	Cetus	01^{h} 01^{m} 35.2^{s}	−06° 44′ 02″	15.5	
348			Spiral galaxy	Phoenix	01^{h} 00^{m} 51.9^{s}	−53° 14′ 41″		
349			Lenticular galaxy	Cetus	01^{h} 01^{m} 50.7^{s}	−06° 48′ 00″	13.5	
350			Lenticular galaxy	Cetus	01^{h} 01^{m} 56.7^{s}	−06° 47′ 45″	15	
351			Spiral galaxy	Cetus	01^{h} 01^{m} 57.9^{s}	−01° 56′ 13″	14.3	
352			Barred spiral galaxy	Cetus	01^{h} 02^{m} 09.0^{s}	−04° 14′ 44″	12.5	
353			Spiral galaxy	Cetus	01^{h} 02^{m} 24.7^{s}	−01° 57′ 29″	14.7	
354			Barred spiral galaxy	Pisces	01^{h} 03^{m} 16.6^{s}	+22° 20′ 33″	14.2	
355			Lenticular galaxy	Cetus	01^{h} 03^{m} 07.0^{s}	−06° 19′ 26″	15	
356			Spiral galaxy	Cetus	01^{h} 03^{m} 07.1^{s}	−06° 59′ 19″	13.5	
357			Spiral galaxy	Cetus	01^{h} 03^{m} 21.9^{s}	−06° 20′ 22″	12	
358			Asterism	Cassiopeia	01^{h} 05^{m}	+62° 02′		
359			Lenticular galaxy	Cetus	01^{h} 04^{m} 17.0^{s}	−00° 45′ 54″	14.8	
360			Spiral galaxy	Tucana	01^{h} 02^{m} 51.4^{s}	−65° 36′ 36″		
361		(Located in Small Magellanic Cloud)	Open cluster	Tucana	01^{h} 02^{m} 12.8^{s}	−71° 36′ 16″	12.4	
362			Globular cluster	Tucana	01^{h} 03^{m} 14.3^{s}	−70° 50′ 54″	8.0	
363			Lenticular galaxy	Cetus	01^{h} 06^{m} 15.8^{s}	−16° 32′ 34″	15	
364			Lenticular galaxy	Cetus	01^{h} 04^{m} 41.0^{s}	−00° 48′ 11″	14.6	
365			Barred spiral galaxy	Sculptor	01^{h} 04^{m} 18.7^{s}	−35° 07′ 13″	12.5	
366			Open cluster	Cassiopeia	01^{h} 07^{m}	+62° 14′		
367			Spiral galaxy	Cetus	01^{h} 05^{m} 48.9^{s}	−12° 07′ 42″	15.3	
368			Lenticular galaxy	Phoenix	01^{h} 04^{m} 22.0^{s}	−43° 16′ 37″		
369			Spiral galaxy	Cetus	01^{h} 05^{m} 08.7^{s}	−17° 45′ 33″	14.3	
370			Triple star	Pisces	01^{h} 06^{m} 44.6^{s}	+32° 25′ 43″		
371		(Located in Small Magellanic Cloud)	Open cluster	Tucana	01^{h} 03^{m} 25^{s}	−72° 04′		
372			Triple star	Pisces	01^{h} 07^{m}	+32° 26′		
373			Elliptical galaxy	Pisces	01^{h} 06^{m} 58.2^{s}	+32° 18′ 30″		
374			Lenticular galaxy	Pisces	01^{h} 07^{m} 06.0^{s}	+32° 47′ 42″	14.3	
375			Elliptical galaxy	Pisces	01^{h} 07^{m} 05.9^{s}	+32° 20′ 53″	16.5	
376		(Located in Small Magellanic Cloud)	Open cluster	Tucana	01^{h} 03^{m} 53.4^{s}	−72° 49′ 34″	11.2	
377			Spiral galaxy	Cetus	01^{h} 06^{m} 34.8^{s}	−20° 19′ 57″		
378			Barred spiral galaxy	Sculptor	01^{h} 06^{m} 12.1^{s}	−30° 10′ 42″		
379			Lenticular galaxy	Pisces	01^{h} 07^{m} 15.9^{s}	+32° 31′ 14″	14.0	
380			Elliptical galaxy	Pisces	01^{h} 07^{m} 17.7^{s}	+32° 28′ 59″	13.9	
381			Open cluster	Cassiopeia	01^{h} 08^{m} 19.9^{s}	+61° 35′ 02″	9.3	
382			Elliptical galaxy	Pisces	01^{h} 07^{m} 24.1^{s}	+32° 24′ 14″	14.2	
383			Radio galaxy	Pisces	01^{h} 07^{m} 25.0^{s}	+32° 24′ 45″	13.6	
384			Elliptical galaxy	Pisces	01^{h} 07^{m} 25.1^{s}	+32° 17′ 34″	14.3	
385			Lenticular galaxy	Pisces	01^{h} 07^{m} 27.4^{s}	+32° 19′ 12″	14.3	
386			Elliptical galaxy	Pisces	01^{h} 07^{m} 31.4^{s}	+32° 21′ 43″	15.4	
387			Elliptical galaxy	Pisces	01^{h} 07^{m} 33.0^{s}	+32° 23′ 28″	17.2	
388			Elliptical galaxy	Pisces	01^{h} 07^{m} 47.2^{s}	+32° 18′ 36″	15.5	
389			Lenticular galaxy	Andromeda	01^{h} 08^{m} 30.1^{s}	+39° 41′ 43″	15.0	
390			Star	Pisces	01^{h} 08^{m} 12.9^{s}	+32° 27′ 12″		
391			Lenticular galaxy	Cetus	01^{h} 07^{m} 22.7^{s}	+00° 55′ 33″	14.6	
392			Lenticular galaxy	Pisces	01^{h} 08^{m} 23.6^{s}	+33° 08′ 01″	13.9	
393			Lenticular galaxy	Andromeda	01^{h} 08^{m} 37.1^{s}	+39° 38′ 38″	13.3	
394			Lenticular galaxy	Pisces	01^{h} 08^{m} 26.0^{s}	+33° 08′ 52″	14.8	
395		(Located in Small Magellanic Cloud)	Open cluster	Tucana	01^{h} 05^{m} 08.0^{s}	−71° 59′ 49″		
396			Lenticular galaxy	Pisces	01^{h} 08^{m} 08.5^{s}	+04° 31′ 51″	16.6	
397			Elliptical galaxy	Pisces	01^{h} 08^{m} 31.1^{s}	+33° 06′ 33″	15.7	
398			Lenticular galaxy	Pisces	01^{h} 08^{m} 53.8^{s}	+32° 30′ 52″	15.4	
399			Barred spiral galaxy	Pisces	01^{h} 08^{m} 59.3^{s}	+32° 38′ 03″	14.5	
400			Star	Pisces	01^{h} 09^{m}	+32° 44′		

== 401–500 ==
NGC number	Image	Other names	Object type	Constellation	Right ascension (J2000)	Declination (J2000)	Apparent magnitude	Note
401			Star	Pisces	01^{h} 09^{m}	+32° 46′	15.4	
402			Star	Pisces	01^{h} 09^{m}	+32° 49′	15.5	
403			Lenticular galaxy	Pisces	01^{h} 09^{m} 14.4^{s}	+32° 45′ 08″	13.3	
404			Lenticular galaxy	Andromeda	01^{h} 09^{m} 27.0^{s}	+35° 43′ 05″	11.3	
405			Double star	Phoenix	01^{h} 08^{m}	−46° 40′		
406			Spiral galaxy	Tucana	01^{h} 07^{m} 24.1^{s}	−69° 52′ 35″	12.5	
407			Spiral galaxy	Pisces	01^{h} 10^{m} 36.7^{s}	+33° 07′ 36″	14.3	
408			Star	Pisces	01^{h} 11^{m}	+33° 06′	14.8	
409			Elliptical galaxy	Sculptor	01^{h} 09^{m} 33.2^{s}	−35° 48′ 19″	12	
410			Elliptical galaxy	Pisces	01^{h} 10^{m} 59.1^{s}	+33° 09′ 07″	12.6	
411		(Located in Small Magellanic Cloud)	Open cluster	Tucana	01^{h} 07^{m} 56.0^{s}	−71° 46′ 05″	11.0	
412			Unknown	Cetus	01^{h} 10^{m} 20.5^{s}	−20° 00′ 57″		
413			Spiral galaxy	Cetus	01^{h} 12^{m} 31.5^{s}	−02° 47′ 37″	14	
414			Interacting galaxies	Pisces	01^{h} 11^{m} 17.7^{s}	+33° 06′ 48″	14.5	
415			Spiral galaxy	Sculptor	01^{h} 10^{m} 05.6^{s}	−35° 29′ 28″	13	
416		(Located in Small Magellanic Cloud)	Globular cluster	Tucana	01^{h} 07^{m} 59.0^{s}	−72° 21′ 20″	11.4	
417			Lenticular galaxy	Cetus	01^{h} 11^{m} 05.6^{s}	−18° 08′ 54″	15.2	
418			Spiral galaxy	Sculptor	01^{h} 10^{m} 35.7^{s}	−30° 13′ 11″	12.9	
419		(Located in Small Magellanic Cloud)	Globular cluster	Tucana	01^{h} 08^{m} 19.5^{s}	−72° 53′ 03″	10.6	
420			Lenticular galaxy	Pisces	01^{h} 12^{m} 09.8^{s}	+32° 07′ 24″	13.4	
421			Unknown	Pisces	01^{h} 12^{m}	+32° 09′		
422		(Located in Small Magellanic Cloud)	Open cluster	Tucana	01^{h} 09^{m} 24.5^{s}	−71° 45′ 59″	13.5	
423			Spiral galaxy	Sculptor	01^{h} 11^{m} 22.7^{s}	−29° 14′ 07″		
424			Spiral galaxy	Sculptor	01^{h} 11^{m} 27.5^{s}	−38° 05′ 01″	12	
425			Spiral galaxy	Andromeda	01^{h} 13^{m} 02.9^{s}	+38° 46′ 07″	13.5	
426			Elliptical galaxy	Cetus	01^{h} 12^{m} 48.7^{s}	−00° 17′ 26″	14.4	
427			Spiral galaxy	Sculptor	01^{h} 12^{m} 19.2^{s}	−32° 03′ 43″	14.9	
428			Irregular galaxy	Cetus	01^{h} 12^{m} 55.8^{s}	+00° 58′ 52″	11.9	
429			Lenticular galaxy	Cetus	01^{h} 12^{m} 57.4^{s}	−00° 20′ 42″	14.4	
430			Elliptical galaxy	Cetus	01^{h} 13^{m} 00.1^{s}	−00° 15′ 09″	13.6	
431			Lenticular galaxy	Andromeda	01^{h} 14^{m} 04.7^{s}	+33° 42′ 15″	14.0	
432			Lenticular galaxy	Tucana	01^{h} 11^{m} 46.2^{s}	−61° 31′ 40″		
433			Open cluster	Cassiopeia	01^{h} 15^{m}	+60° 08′		
434			Spiral galaxy	Tucana	01^{h} 12^{m} 13.6^{s}	−58° 14′ 47″	13.0	
435			Spiral galaxy	Cetus	01^{h} 14^{m} 00.0^{s}	+02° 04′ 16″	15.0	
436			Open cluster	Cassiopeia	01^{h} 16^{m}	+58° 49′	8.0	
437			Spiral galaxy	Pisces	01^{h} 14^{m} 22.4^{s}	+05° 55′ 38″	14.0	
438			Spiral galaxy	Sculptor	01^{h} 13^{m} 33.5^{s}	−37° 54′ 08″	12	
439			Lenticular galaxy	Sculptor	01^{h} 13^{m} 47.3^{s}	−31° 44′ 52″	13	
440			Spiral galaxy	Tucana	01^{h} 12^{m} 48.5^{s}	−58° 16′ 58″	13.7	
441			Spiral galaxy	Sculptor	01^{h} 13^{m} 51.2^{s}	−31° 47′ 20″		
442			Spiral galaxy	Cetus	01^{h} 14^{m} 38.5^{s}	−01° 01′ 14″	14.5	
443			Spiral galaxy	Pisces	01^{h} 15^{m} 07.6^{s}	+33° 22′ 38″	14.4	
444			Spiral galaxy	Pisces	01^{h} 15^{m} 49.7^{s}	+31° 04′ 50″	14.7	
445			Lenticular galaxy	Cetus	01^{h} 14^{m} 38.7^{s}	+01° 49′ 45″	15.0	
446		IC 89	Lenticular galaxy	Pisces	01^{h} 16^{m} 03.7^{s}	+04° 17′ 38″	13.8	
447			Spiral galaxy	Pisces	01^{h} 15^{m} 37.7^{s}	+33° 04′ 04″	14.0	
448			Lenticular galaxy	Cetus	01^{h} 15^{m} 16.7^{s}	−01° 37′ 35″	13.2	
449			Spiral galaxy	Pisces	01^{h} 16^{m} 07.2^{s}	+33° 05′ 22″	15.5	
450			Spiral galaxy	Cetus	01^{h} 15^{m} 32.8^{s}	−00° 51′ 17″	13.0	
451			Spiral galaxy	Pisces	01^{h} 16^{m} 12.4^{s}	+33° 03′ 51″	15.5	
452			Spiral galaxy	Pisces	01^{h} 16^{m} 15.0^{s}	+31° 02′ 01″	14.0	
453			Triple star	Pisces	01^{h} 16^{m}	+33° 05′		
454			Interacting galaxies	Phoenix	01^{h} 14^{m} 26.1^{s}	−55° 23′ 40″	13.4	
455			Spiral galaxy	Pisces	01^{h} 15^{m} 57.7^{s}	+05° 10′ 42″	13.9	
456		(Located in Small Magellanic Cloud)	Open cluster	Tucana	01^{h} 14^{m}	−73° 16′	14.2	
457			Open cluster	Cassiopeia	01^{h} 19^{m} 40^{s}	+58° 17′	7.0	
458		(Located in Small Magellanic Cloud)	Open cluster	Tucana	01^{h} 14^{m} 53.4^{s}	−71° 32′ 59″	11.9	
459			Spiral galaxy	Pisces	01^{h} 18^{m} 08.3^{s}	+17° 33′ 44″	15.7	
460		(Located in Small Magellanic Cloud)	Open cluster	Tucana	01^{h} 14^{m} 41.5^{s}	−73° 17′ 51″		
461			Spiral galaxy	Sculptor	01^{h} 17^{m} 20.5^{s}	−33° 50′ 25″	13	
462			Galaxy	Pisces	01^{h} 18^{m} 11.0^{s}	+04° 13′ 34″		
463			Lenticular galaxy	Pisces	01^{h} 18^{m} 58.3^{s}	+16° 19′ 32″	15.2	
464			Double star	Andromeda	01^{h} 19^{m} 06.4^{s}	+34° 56′ 48″		
465		(Located in Small Magellanic Cloud)	Open cluster	Tucana	01^{h} 16^{m}	−73° 19′		
466			Lenticular galaxy	Tucana	01^{h} 17^{m} 13.4^{s}	−58° 54′ 35″		
467			Lenticular galaxy	Pisces	01^{h} 19^{m} 10.2^{s}	+03° 18′ 02″	13.3	
468			Galaxy	Pisces	01^{h} 19^{m} 48.5^{s}	+32° 46′ 02″	15.1	
469			Galaxy	Pisces	01^{h} 19^{m} 33.0^{s}	+14° 52′ 17″	15.0	
470			Spiral galaxy	Pisces	01^{h} 19^{m} 45.0^{s}	+03° 24′ 35″	12.4	
471			Lenticular galaxy	Pisces	01^{h} 19^{m} 59.5^{s}	+14° 47′ 12″	14.0	
472			Galaxy	Pisces	01^{h} 20^{m} 28.8^{s}	+32° 42′ 32″	14.2	
473			Spiral galaxy	Pisces	01^{h} 19^{m} 55.1^{s}	+16° 32′ 40″	13.4	
474			Lenticular galaxy	Pisces	01^{h} 20^{m} 06.8^{s}	+03° 24′ 56″	12.9	
475			Galaxy	Pisces	01^{h} 20^{m} 02.0^{s}	+14° 51′ 40″	17.4	
476			Galaxy	Pisces	01^{h} 20^{m} 19.8^{s}	+16° 01′ 12″	15.2	
477			Spiral galaxy	Andromeda	01^{h} 21^{m} 20.3^{s}	+40° 29′ 19″	14.0	
478			Spiral galaxy	Cetus	01^{h} 20^{m} 09.3^{s}	−22° 22′ 39″	14.8	
479			Spiral galaxy	Pisces	01^{h} 21^{m} 15.9^{s}	+03° 51′ 44″	15.1	
480			Galaxy	Cetus	01^{h} 20^{m} 34.3^{s}	−09° 52′ 49″	16.3	
481			Lenticular galaxy	Cetus	01^{h} 21^{m} 12.4^{s}	−09° 12′ 40″	14	
482			Spiral galaxy	Phoenix	01^{h} 20^{m} 20.4^{s}	−40° 57′ 60″	14.5	
483			Spiral galaxy	Pisces	01^{h} 21^{m} 56.4^{s}	+33° 31′ 16″	14.0	
484			Elliptical galaxy	Tucana	01^{h} 19^{m} 34.9^{s}	−58° 31′ 29″	13.0	
485			Spiral galaxy	Pisces	01^{h} 21^{m} 27.7^{s}	+07° 01′ 04″	14.2	
486			Galaxy	Pisces	01^{h} 22^{m} 10.6^{s}	+05° 24′ 40″		
487			Spiral galaxy	Cetus	01^{h} 21^{m} 55.1^{s}	−16° 22′ 13″	14.0	
488			Spiral galaxy	Pisces	01^{h} 21^{m} 47.0^{s}	+05° 15′ 18″	11.4	
489			Lenticular galaxy	Pisces	01^{h} 21^{m} 54.0^{s}	+09° 12′ 24″	13.4	
490			Spiral galaxy	Pisces	01^{h} 22^{m} 02.9^{s}	+05° 22′ 02″	15.6	
491			Spiral galaxy	Sculptor	01^{h} 21^{m} 20.3^{s}	−34° 03′ 48″	13.2	
492			Galaxy	Pisces	01^{h} 22^{m} 13.6^{s}	+05° 25′ 01″	15.5	
493			Spiral galaxy	Cetus	01^{h} 22^{m} 09.5^{s}	+00° 56′ 48″	13.0	
494			Spiral galaxy	Pisces	01^{h} 22^{m} 55.4^{s}	+33° 10′ 26″	13.8	
495			Spiral galaxy	Pisces	01^{h} 22^{m} 56.1^{s}	+33° 28′ 17″	14.0	
496			Spiral galaxy	Pisces	01^{h} 23^{m} 11.5^{s}	+33° 31′ 45″	14.3	
497			Spiral galaxy	Cetus	01^{h} 22^{m} 23.9^{s}	−00° 52′ 32″	14.1	
498			Lenticular galaxy	Pisces	01^{h} 23^{m} 11.3^{s}	+33° 29′ 22″	16	
499			Lenticular galaxy	Pisces	01^{h} 23^{m} 11.5^{s}	+33° 27′ 37″	13.3	
500			Galaxy	Pisces	01^{h} 22^{m} 39.4^{s}	+05° 23′ 14″	15.2	

== 501–600 ==
NGC number	Image	Other names	Object type	Constellation	Right ascension (J2000)	Declination (J2000)	Apparent magnitude	Note
501			Elliptical galaxy	Pisces	01^{h} 23^{m} 22.4^{s}	+33° 25′ 59″	15.2	
502			Lenticular galaxy	Pisces	01^{h} 22^{m} 55.7^{s}	+09° 02′ 57″	13.8	
503			Elliptical galaxy	Pisces	01^{h} 23^{m} 28.4^{s}	+33° 19′ 54″	15.1	
504			Lenticular galaxy	Pisces	01^{h} 23^{m} 28.0^{s}	+33° 12′ 16″	14.0	
505			Lenticular galaxy	Pisces	01^{h} 22^{m} 57.2^{s}	+09° 28′ 08″	15.1	
506			Star	Pisces	01^{h} 24^{m}	+33° 14′	14.9	
507			Lenticular galaxy	Pisces	01^{h} 23^{m} 40.0^{s}	+33° 15′ 22″	13.0	
508			Elliptical galaxy	Pisces	01^{h} 23^{m} 40.6^{s}	+33° 16′ 50″	14.5	
509			Lenticular galaxy	Pisces	01^{h} 23^{m} 24.2^{s}	+09° 26′ 01″	14.7	
510			Double star	Pisces	01^{h} 24^{m}	+33° 26′		
511			Elliptical galaxy	Pisces	01^{h} 23^{m} 30.8^{s}	+11° 17′ 27″	15.4	
512			Spiral galaxy	Andromeda	01^{h} 23^{m} 59.9^{s}	+33° 54′ 29″	14.0	
513			Spiral galaxy	Andromeda	01^{h} 24^{m} 26.9^{s}	+33° 47′ 57″	13.4	
514			Spiral galaxy	Pisces	01^{h} 24^{m} 04.0^{s}	+12° 55′ 02″	12.8	
515			Lenticular galaxy	Pisces	01^{h} 24^{m} 38.6^{s}	+33° 28′ 22″	14.3	
516			Lenticular galaxy	Pisces	01^{h} 24^{m} 08.1^{s}	+09° 33′ 06″	14.3	
517			Lenticular galaxy	Pisces	01^{h} 24^{m} 43.9^{s}	+33° 25′ 47″	13.6	
518			Spiral galaxy	Pisces	01^{h} 24^{m} 17.8^{s}	+09° 19′ 51″	14.4	
519			Elliptical galaxy	Cetus	01^{h} 24^{m} 28.7^{s}	−01° 38′ 31″	15.3	
520			Interacting galaxies	Pisces	01^{h} 24^{m} 35.4^{s}	+03° 47′ 25″	12.4	
521			Spiral galaxy	Cetus	01^{h} 24^{m} 33.8^{s}	+01° 43′ 53″	12.9	
522			Spiral galaxy	Pisces	01^{h} 24^{m} 45.9^{s}	+09° 59′ 41″	14.2	
523			Irregular galaxy	Andromeda	01^{h} 25^{m} 20.9^{s}	+34° 01′ 29″	13.5	
524			Lenticular galaxy	Pisces	01^{h} 24^{m} 47.7^{s}	+09° 32′ 20″	11.5	
525			Lenticular galaxy	Pisces	01^{h} 24^{m} 53.0^{s}	+09° 42′ 11″	14.5	
526			Interacting galaxies	Sculptor	01^{h} 23^{m} 54.2^{s}	−35° 03′ 55″	14.5	
527			Spiral galaxy	Sculptor	01^{h} 23^{m} 58.2^{s}	−35° 06′ 51″	13	
528			Lenticular galaxy	Andromeda	01^{h} 25^{m} 33.6^{s}	+33° 40′ 16″	13.7	
529			Elliptical galaxy	Andromeda	01^{h} 25^{m} 40.4^{s}	+34° 42′ 46″	13.1	
530			Lenticular galaxy	Cetus	01^{h} 24^{m} 41.8^{s}	−01° 35′ 16″	14.0	
531			Spiral galaxy	Andromeda	01^{h} 26^{m} 19.1^{s}	+34° 45′ 14″	14.9	
532			Spiral galaxy	Pisces	01^{h} 25^{m} 17.3^{s}	+09° 15′ 51″	13.5	
533			Elliptical galaxy	Cetus	01^{h} 25^{m} 31.5^{s}	+01° 45′ 32″	13.1	
534			Lenticular galaxy	Sculptor	01^{h} 24^{m} 44.7^{s}	−38° 07′ 45″	14	
535			Lenticular galaxy	Cetus	01^{h} 25^{m} 31.2^{s}	−01° 24′ 32″	14.9	
536			Spiral galaxy	Andromeda	01^{h} 26^{m} 21.9^{s}	+34° 42′ 11″	13.2	
537		(Duplicate of NGC 523)	Irregular galaxy	Andromeda	01^{h} 25^{m} 20.9^{s}	+34° 01′ 29″	13.5	
538			Spiral galaxy	Cetus	01^{h} 25^{m} 26.2^{s}	−01° 33′ 04″	14.7	
539			Spiral galaxy	Cetus	01^{h} 25^{m} 21.7^{s}	−18° 09′ 50″	13.9	
540			Lenticular galaxy	Cetus	01^{h} 27^{m} 08.9^{s}	−20° 02′ 12″		
541			Lenticular galaxy	Cetus	01^{h} 25^{m} 44.3^{s}	−01° 22′ 47″	14.6	
542			Spiral galaxy	Andromeda	01^{h} 26^{m} 30.9^{s}	+34° 40′ 32″	15.4	
543			Lenticular galaxy	Cetus	01^{h} 25^{m} 50.0^{s}	−01° 17′ 34″	15.0	
544			Lenticular galaxy	Sculptor	01^{h} 25^{m} 12.0^{s}	−38° 05′ 38″	15.1	
545			Lenticular galaxy	Cetus	01^{h} 25^{m} 59.2^{s}	−01° 20′ 25″	14.4	
546			Spiral galaxy	Sculptor	01^{h} 25^{m} 12.8^{s}	−38° 04′ 11″	14.8	
547			Elliptical galaxy	Cetus	01^{h} 26^{m} 00.8^{s}	−01° 20′ 43″	14.4	
548			Elliptical galaxy	Cetus	01^{h} 26^{m} 02.6^{s}	−01° 13′ 33″	15.1	
549			Spiral galaxy	Sculptor	01^{h} 25^{m} 28.3^{s}	−38° 16′ 03″	13	
550			Spiral galaxy	Cetus	01^{h} 26^{m} 42.6^{s}	+02° 01′ 20″	13.6	
551			Spiral galaxy	Andromeda	01^{h} 27^{m} 40.8^{s}	+37° 10′ 58″	13.5	
552			(Identification uncertain)	Pisces	01^{h} 28^{m}	+33° 28′		
553			Lenticular galaxy	Pisces	01^{h} 26^{m} 12.6^{s}	+33° 24′ 18″		
554			Interacting galaxies	Cetus	01^{h} 27^{m} 09.6^{s}	−22° 43′ 31″		
555			Spiral galaxy	Cetus	01^{h} 27^{m} 11.8^{s}	−22° 45′ 44″		
556			Lenticular galaxy	Cetus	01^{h} 27^{m} 12.6^{s}	−22° 41′ 52″		
557			Lenticular galaxy	Cetus	01^{h} 26^{m} 25.2^{s}	−01° 38′ 21″	14.2	
558			Elliptical galaxy	Cetus	01^{h} 27^{m} 16.2^{s}	−01° 58′ 15″	15.0	
559			Open cluster	Cassiopeia	01^{h} 29^{m} 21.6^{s}	+63° 16′ 48″	9.9	
560			lenticular galaxy	Cetus	01^{h} 27^{m} 25.4^{s}	−01° 54′ 49″	14.0	
561			Spiral galaxy	Andromeda	01^{h} 28^{m} 18.9^{s}	+34° 18′ 30″	14.1	
562			Spiral galaxy	Andromeda	01^{h} 28^{m} 29.4^{s}	+48° 23′ 13″	14.5	
563			Spiral galaxy	Cetus	01^{h} 27^{m} 10.1^{s}	−18° 39′ 12″	14.2	
564			Elliptical galaxy	Cetus	01^{h} 27^{m} 48.3^{s}	−01° 52′ 48″	13.8	
565			Spiral galaxy	Cetus	01^{h} 28^{m} 10.2^{s}	−01° 18′ 22″	14.5	
566			Lenticular galaxy	Pisces	01^{h} 29^{m} 03.1^{s}	+32° 19′ 56″	14.6	
567			Galaxy	Cetus	01^{h} 27^{m} 02.4^{s}	−10° 15′ 55″	14	
568			Lenticular galaxy	Sculptor	01^{h} 27^{m} 56.8^{s}	−35° 42′ 60″	12.5	
569			Spiral galaxy	Pisces	01^{h} 29^{m} 07.3^{s}	+11° 07′ 51″	14.7	
570			Spiral galaxy	Cetus	01^{h} 28^{m} 58.7^{s}	−00° 56′ 57″	14.2	
571			Spiral galaxy	Pisces	01^{h} 29^{m} 56.2^{s}	+32° 30′ 03″	15.0	
572			Lenticular galaxy	Sculptor	01^{h} 28^{m} 36.5^{s}	−39° 18′ 27″	15.5	
573			Spiral galaxy	Andromeda	01^{h} 30^{m} 49.4^{s}	+41° 15′ 26″	13.5	
574			Spiral galaxy	Sculptor	01^{h} 29^{m} 03.0^{s}	−35° 35′ 56″	14	
575			Spiral galaxy	Pisces	01^{h} 30^{m} 46.7^{s}	+21° 26′ 25″	13.8	
576			Spiral galaxy	Phoenix	01^{h} 28^{m} 57.4^{s}	−51° 35′ 56″		
577			Spiral galaxy	Cetus	01^{h} 30^{m} 40.8^{s}	−01° 59′ 41″	14.3	
578			Spiral galaxy	Cetus	01^{h} 30^{m} 28.7^{s}	−22° 40′ 01″	11.5	
579			Spiral galaxy	Triangulum	01^{h} 31^{m} 46.7^{s}	+33° 36′ 56″	13.6	
580			Spiral galaxy	Cetus	01^{h} 30^{m} 40.8^{s}	−01° 59′ 41″	14.3	
581		Messier 103	Open cluster	Cassiopeia	01^{h} 33^{m}	+60° 39′	7.7	
582			Spiral galaxy	Triangulum	01^{h} 31^{m} 58.1^{s}	+33° 28′ 34″	13.7	
583			Lenticular galaxy	Cetus	01^{h} 29^{m} 44.2^{s}	−18° 20′ 22″	15.0	
584			Elliptical galaxy	Cetus	01^{h} 31^{m} 20.7^{s}	−06° 52′ 06″	12	
585			Spiral galaxy	Cetus	01^{h} 31^{m} 42.1^{s}	−00° 55′ 59″	14.4	
586			Spiral galaxy	Cetus	01^{h} 31^{m} 36.9^{s}	−06° 53′ 38″	14	
587			Spiral galaxy	Triangulum	01^{h} 32^{m} 33.5^{s}	+35° 21′ 30″	13.7	
588		(Located in the Triangulum Galaxy)	Diffuse nebula	Triangulum	01^{h} 32^{m} 45.2^{s}	+30° 38′ 54″	11.5	
589			Spiral galaxy	Cetus	01^{h} 32^{m} 39.9^{s}	−12° 02′ 34″	15.0	
590			Spiral galaxy	Andromeda	01^{h} 33^{m} 41.1^{s}	+44° 55′ 44″	14.2	
591			Lenticular galaxy	Andromeda	01^{h} 33^{m} 31.3^{s}	+35° 40′ 05″	14.5	
592		(Located in Triangulum Galaxy)	Diffuse nebula	Triangulum	01^{h} 33^{m} 00.1^{s}	+30° 34′ 37″	13.0	
593			Lenticular galaxy	Cetus	01^{h} 32^{m} 20.8^{s}	−12° 21′ 17″	14	
594			Spiral galaxy	Cetus	01^{h} 32^{m} 56.8^{s}	−16° 32′ 10″	13.9	
595		(Located in Triangulum Galaxy)	Diffuse nebula	Triangulum	01^{h} 33^{m} 35.5^{s}	+30° 41′ 52″	13.1	
596			Elliptical galaxy	Cetus	01^{h} 32^{m} 52.1^{s}	−07° 01′ 55″	11.5	
597			Spiral galaxy	Sculptor	01^{h} 32^{m} 14.8^{s}	−33° 29′ 51″	14.5	
598		Messier 33; Triangulum Galaxy	Spiral galaxy	Triangulum	01^{h} 33^{m} 51.0^{s}	+30° 39′ 37″	6.3	
599			Lenticular galaxy	Cetus	01^{h} 32^{m} 53.8^{s}	−12° 11′ 29″	13.7	
600			Spiral galaxy	Cetus	01^{h} 33^{m} 05.4^{s}	−07° 18′ 41″	12.5	

== 601–700 ==
NGC number	Image	Other names	Object type	Constellation	Right ascension (J2000)	Declination (J2000)	Apparent magnitude	Note
601			Galaxy	Cetus	01^{h} 32^{m} 53.8^{s}	−12° 11′ 29″	13	
602		(Located in Small Magellanic Cloud)	Open cluster	Hydrus	01^{h} 30^{m}	−73° 34′		
603			Triple star	Triangulum	01^{h} 34^{m} 44^{s}	+30° 14′	14	
604		(Located in Triangulum Galaxy)	Diffuse nebula	Triangulum	01^{h} 34^{m} 33.2^{s}	+30° 47′ 06″	11.5	
605			Lenticular galaxy	Andromeda	01^{h} 35^{m} 02.5^{s}	+41° 14′ 53″	14.3	
606			Spiral galaxy	Pisces	01^{h} 34^{m} 50.2^{s}	+21° 25′ 05″	14.5	
607			Triple star	Cetus	01^{h} 34^{m}	−07° 25′		
608			Spiral galaxy	Triangulum	01^{h} 35^{m} 28.3^{s}	+33° 39′ 23″	14.0	
609			Open cluster	Cassiopeia	01^{h} 36^{m} 24.9^{s}	+64° 32′ 12″	12.3	
610			Unknown	Cetus	01^{h} 34^{m}	−20° 09′		
611			Unknown	Cetus	01^{h} 34^{m}	−20° 08′		
612			Lenticular galaxy	Sculptor	01^{h} 33^{m} 57.7^{s}	−36° 29′ 35″	14.2	
613			Spiral galaxy	Sculptor	01^{h} 34^{m} 18.2^{s}	−29° 25′ 06″	10.8	
614			Lenticular galaxy	Triangulum	01^{h} 35^{m} 52.3^{s}	+33° 40′ 54″	13.9	
615			Spiral galaxy	Cetus	01^{h} 35^{m} 05.7^{s}	−07° 20′ 27″	12	
616			Double star	Triangulum	01^{h} 36^{m}	+33° 46′		
617			Galaxy	Cetus	01^{h} 34^{m} 02.7^{s}	−09° 46′ 28″	15.2	
618		(Possible duplicate of NGC 614)	Lenticular galaxy	Triangulum	01^{h} 35^{m} 52.3^{s}	+33° 40′ 54″	13.9	
619			Spiral galaxy	Sculptor	01^{h} 34^{m} 51.7^{s}	−36° 29′ 21″	14	
620			Irregular galaxy	Andromeda	01^{h} 37^{m} 00.0^{s}	+42° 19′ 20″	13.9	
621			Lenticular galaxy	Triangulum	01^{h} 36^{m} 49.2^{s}	+35° 30′ 43″	14.2	
622			Spiral galaxy	Cetus	01^{h} 36^{m} 00.1^{s}	+00° 39′ 49″	14.1	
623			Elliptical galaxy	Sculptor	01^{h} 35^{m} 06.3^{s}	−36° 29′ 23″	13.5	
624			Spiral galaxy	Cetus	01^{h} 35^{m} 51.0^{s}	−10° 00′ 10″	14	
625			Irregular galaxy	Phoenix	01^{h} 35^{m} 04.7^{s}	−41° 26′ 14″	12.2	
626			Spiral galaxy	Sculptor	01^{h} 35^{m} 12.0^{s}	−39° 08′ 41″	14	
627		(Duplicate of NGC 614)	Lenticular galaxy	Triangulum	01^{h} 35^{m} 52.3^{s}	+33° 40′ 54″	13.9	
628		Messier 74	Spiral galaxy	Pisces	01^{h} 36^{m} 41.8^{s}	+15° 46′ 60″	10.5	
629			Asterism	Cassiopeia	01^{h} 40^{m}	+72° 53′		
630			Elliptical galaxy	Sculptor	01^{h} 35^{m} 36.5^{s}	−39° 21′ 28″	13.5	
631			Elliptical galaxy	Pisces	01^{h} 36^{m} 47.1^{s}	+05° 50′ 06″	15.0	
632			Lenticular galaxy	Pisces	01^{h} 37^{m} 17.7^{s}	+05° 52′ 38″	13.5	
633			Spiral galaxy	Sculptor	01^{h} 36^{m} 23.5^{s}	−37° 19′ 16″	12.9	
634			Spiral galaxy	Triangulum	01^{h} 38^{m} 18.7^{s}	+35° 21′ 53″	14.0	
635			Spiral galaxy	Cetus	01^{h} 38^{m} 17.8^{s}	−22° 55′ 44″		
636			Elliptical galaxy	Cetus	01^{h} 39^{m} 06.5^{s}	−07° 30′ 46″	12.5	
637			Open cluster	Cassiopeia	01^{h} 43^{m}	+64° 02′	8.6	
638			Spiral galaxy	Pisces	01^{h} 39^{m} 37.9^{s}	+07° 14′ 14″	14.4	
639			Spiral galaxy	Sculptor	01^{h} 38^{m} 59.1^{s}	−29° 55′ 31″	15.4	
640			Spiral galaxy	Cetus	01^{h} 39^{m} 24.8^{s}	−09° 24′ 03″	15	
641			Elliptical galaxy	Phoenix	01^{h} 38^{m} 39.2^{s}	−42° 31′ 37″	13	
642			Spiral galaxy	Sculptor	01^{h} 39^{m} 06.5^{s}	−29° 54′ 56″	13.1	
643		(Located in Small Magellanic Cloud)	Open cluster	Hydrus	01^{h} 35^{m} 01.1^{s}	−75° 33′ 26″	13	
644			Spiral galaxy	Phoenix	01^{h} 38^{m} 52.9^{s}	−42° 35′ 07″	15	
645			Spiral galaxy	Pisces	01^{h} 40^{m} 08.8^{s}	+05° 43′ 36″	13.8	
646			Interacting galaxies	Hydrus	01^{h} 37^{m} 23.6^{s}	−64° 53′ 45″	13.6	
647			Lenticular galaxy	Cetus	01^{h} 39^{m} 56.2^{s}	−09° 14′ 33″	15	
648			Lenticular galaxy	Cetus	01^{h} 38^{m} 39.6^{s}	−17° 49′ 52″	14.4	
649			Spiral galaxy	Cetus	01^{h} 40^{m} 07.4^{s}	−09° 16′ 19″	14.7	
650		Messier 76; Little Dumbbell Nebula	Planetary nebula	Perseus	01^{h} 42^{m} 19.9^{s}	+51° 34′ 31″	16.1	
651		(Duplicate of NGC 650)	Planetary nebula	Perseus	01^{h} 42^{m} 19.9^{s}	+51° 34′ 31″	16.1	
652			Spiral galaxy	Pisces	01^{h} 40^{m} 43.3^{s}	+07° 58′ 55″	14.7	
653			Spiral galaxy	Andromeda	01^{h} 42^{m} 25.9^{s}	+35° 38′ 18″	14.1	
654			Open cluster	Cassiopeia	01^{h} 44^{m}	+61° 53′	7.4	
655			Lenticular galaxy	Cetus	01^{h} 41^{m} 55.1^{s}	−13° 04′ 54″	14	
656			Lenticular galaxy	Pisces	01^{h} 42^{m} 27.4^{s}	+26° 08′ 34″	13.5	
657			Open cluster	Cassiopeia	01^{h} 44^{m}	+55° 52′		
658			Spiral galaxy	Pisces	01^{h} 42^{m} 09.8^{s}	+12° 36′ 07″	13.6	
659			Open cluster	Cassiopeia	01^{h} 44^{m}	+60° 40′	8.4	
660			Spiral galaxy	Pisces	01^{h} 43^{m} 01.7^{s}	+13° 38′ 36″	12.8	
661			Elliptical galaxy	Triangulum	01^{h} 44^{m} 14.6^{s}	+28° 42′ 21″	13.0	
662			Spiral galaxy	Andromeda	01^{h} 44^{m} 35.6^{s}	+37° 41′ 45″	13.6	
663			Open cluster	Cassiopeia	01^{h} 46^{m}	+61° 14′	7.8	
664			Spiral galaxy	Pisces	01^{h} 43^{m} 45.9^{s}	+04° 13′ 22″	13.9	
665			Lenticular galaxy	Pisces	01^{h} 44^{m} 56.2^{s}	+10° 25′ 23″	13.5	
666			Spiral galaxy	Triangulum	01^{h} 46^{m} 06.3^{s}	+34° 22′ 27″	13.6	
667			Lenticular galaxy	Cetus	01^{h} 44^{m} 56.7^{s}	−22° 55′ 09″		
668			Spiral galaxy	Andromeda	01^{h} 46^{m} 22.7^{s}	+36° 27′ 36″	13.5	
669			Spiral galaxy	Triangulum	01^{h} 47^{m} 16.4^{s}	+35° 33′ 46″	12.9	
670			Lenticular galaxy	Triangulum	01^{h} 47^{m} 25.1^{s}	+27° 53′ 09″	13.5	
671			Spiral galaxy	Aries	01^{h} 46^{m} 59.2^{s}	+13° 07′ 30″	14.3	
672			Spiral galaxy	Triangulum	01^{h} 47^{m} 54.1^{s}	+27° 25′ 56″	11.4	
673			Spiral galaxy	Aries	01^{h} 48^{m} 22.6^{s}	+11° 31′ 16″	13.3	
674		(Duplicate of NGC 697)	Spiral galaxy	Aries	01^{h} 51^{m} 17.6^{s}	+22° 21′ 28″	12.7	
675			Spiral galaxy	Aries	01^{h} 49^{m} 08.6^{s}	+13° 03′ 34″	15.5	
676			Spiral galaxy	Pisces	01^{h} 48^{m} 57.4^{s}	+05° 54′ 26″	12	
677			Elliptical galaxy	Aries	01^{h} 49^{m} 14.1^{s}	+13° 03′ 19″	14.3	
678			Spiral galaxy	Aries	01^{h} 49^{m} 24.9^{s}	+21° 59′ 48″	13.3	
679			Lenticular galaxy	Andromeda	01^{h} 49^{m} 43.9^{s}	+35° 47′ 07″	13.1	
680			Elliptical galaxy	Aries	01^{h} 49^{m} 47.4^{s}	+21° 58′ 14″	13.0	
681			Spiral galaxy	Cetus	01^{h} 49^{m} 10.7^{s}	−10° 25′ 35″	12	
682			Lenticular galaxy	Cetus	01^{h} 49^{m} 04.5^{s}	−14° 58′ 29″	13	
683			Spiral galaxy	Aries	01^{h} 49^{m} 46.8^{s}	+11° 42′ 03″	14.8	
684			Spiral galaxy	Triangulum	01^{h} 50^{m} 14.0^{s}	+27° 38′ 45″	13.2	
685			Spiral galaxy	Eridanus	01^{h} 47^{m} 43.1^{s}	−52° 45′ 40″	12.0	
686			Lenticular galaxy	Fornax	01^{h} 48^{m} 56.3^{s}	−23° 47′ 55″	13.0	
687			Lenticular galaxy	Andromeda	01^{h} 50^{m} 33.3^{s}	+36° 22′ 14″	14.4	
688			Spiral galaxy	Triangulum	01^{h} 50^{m} 44.3^{s}	+35° 17′ 03″	13.3	
689			Spiral galaxy	Fornax	01^{h} 49^{m} 51.8^{s}	−27° 27′ 56″	14.4	
690			Spiral galaxy	Cetus	01^{h} 47^{m} 48.2^{s}	−16° 43′ 19″	14.4	
691			Spiral galaxy	Aries	01^{h} 50^{m} 41.7^{s}	+21° 45′ 34″	13.5	
692			Spiral galaxy	Phoenix	01^{h} 48^{m} 42.0^{s}	−48° 38′ 57″		
693			Spiral galaxy	Pisces	01^{h} 50^{m} 30.9^{s}	+06° 08′ 41″	13.5	
694			Lenticular galaxy	Aries	01^{h} 50^{m} 58.6^{s}	+21° 59′ 48″	13.9	
695			Lenticular galaxy	Aries	01^{h} 51^{m} 14.4^{s}	+22° 34′ 56″	13.7	
696			Lenticular galaxy	Fornax	01^{h} 49^{m} 30.9^{s}	−34° 54′ 22″	13.5	
697			Spiral galaxy	Aries	01^{h} 51^{m} 17.6^{s}	+22° 21′ 28″	12.7	
698			Spiral galaxy	Fornax	01^{h} 49^{m} 43.8^{s}	−34° 49′ 52″	14.5	
699			Spiral galaxy	Cetus	01^{h} 50^{m} 43.7^{s}	−12° 02′ 09″	14	
700			Lenticular galaxy	Andromeda	01^{h} 52^{m} 12.8^{s}	+36° 05′ 49″	15.6	

== 701–800 ==
NGC number	Image	Other names	Object type	Constellation	Right ascension (J2000)	Declination (J2000)	Apparent magnitude	Note
701			Spiral galaxy	Cetus	01^{h} 51^{m} 03.8^{s}	−09° 42′ 08″	12	
702			Interacting galaxies	Cetus	01^{h} 51^{m} 18.3^{s}	−04° 03′ 21″	14	
703			Lenticular galaxy	Andromeda	01^{h} 52^{m} 39.7^{s}	+36° 10′ 16″	14.5	
704			Interacting galaxies	Andromeda	01^{h} 52^{m} 37.7^{s}	+36° 07′ 37″	14.1	
705			Lenticular galaxy	Andromeda	01^{h} 52^{m} 41.7^{s}	+36° 08′ 38″	14.5	
706			Spiral galaxy	Pisces	01^{h} 51^{m} 50.6^{s}	+06° 17′ 47″	13.2	
707			Lenticular galaxy	Cetus	01^{h} 51^{m} 27.2^{s}	−08° 30′ 21″	14	
708			Elliptical galaxy	Andromeda	01^{h} 52^{m} 39.7^{s}	+36° 10′ 16″	14.5	
709			Lenticular galaxy	Andromeda	01^{h} 52^{m} 50.6^{s}	+36° 13′ 21″	15.2	
710			Spiral galaxy	Andromeda	01^{h} 52^{m} 54.1^{s}	+36° 03′ 12″	14.3	
711			Lenticular galaxy	Aries	01^{h} 52^{m} 27.8^{s}	+17° 30′ 44″	14.5	
712			Lenticular galaxy	Andromeda	01^{h} 53^{m} 08.6^{s}	+36° 49′ 10″	13.9	
713			Spiral galaxy	Cetus	01^{h} 55^{m} 21.5^{s}	−09° 05′ 02″	14.9	
714			Lenticular galaxy	Andromeda	01^{h} 53^{m} 29.8^{s}	+36° 13′ 15″	13.9	
715			Galaxy	Cetus	01^{h} 53^{m} 12.4^{s}	−12° 52′ 26″	15	
716			Spiral galaxy	Aries	01^{h} 52^{m} 59.7^{s}	+12° 42′ 28″	14.0	
717			Spiral galaxy	Andromeda	01^{h} 53^{m} 55.2^{s}	+36° 13′ 45″	14.7	
718			Intermediate spiral galaxy	Pisces	01^{h} 53^{m} 13.2^{s}	+04° 11′ 44″	12.8	
719			Lenticular galaxy	Aries	01^{h} 53^{m} 39.0^{s}	+19° 50′ 25″	14.7	
720			Elliptical galaxy	Cetus	01^{h} 53^{m} 00.4^{s}	−13° 44′ 18″	11	
721			Spiral galaxy	Andromeda	01^{h} 54^{m} 45.6^{s}	+39° 22′ 59″	13.8	
722			Spiral galaxy	Aries	01^{h} 54^{m} 47.0^{s}	+20° 41′ 53″	14.6	
723			Spiral galaxy	Cetus	01^{h} 53^{m} 45.6^{s}	−23° 45′ 28″	13.1	
724			Spiral galaxy	Fornax	01^{h} 53^{m} 45.6^{s}	−23° 45′ 28″	13.1	
725			Spiral galaxy	Cetus	01^{h} 52^{m} 35.5^{s}	−16° 31′ 04″	14.3	
726			Irregular galaxy	Cetus	01^{h} 55^{m} 31.9^{s}	−10° 48′ 04″	14.3	
727			Spiral galaxy	Fornax	01^{h} 53^{m} 49.2^{s}	−35° 51′ 22″	14.5	
728			Triple star	Pisces	01^{h} 55^{m}	+04° 12′		
729		(Duplicate of NGC 727)	Spiral galaxy	Fornax	01^{h} 53^{m} 49.2^{s}	−35° 51′ 22″	14.5	
730			Star	Pisces	01^{h} 55^{m}	+05° 37′		
731			Elliptical galaxy	Cetus	01^{h} 54^{m} 56.9^{s}	−09° 00′ 47″	13	
732			Lenticular galaxy	Andromeda	01^{h} 56^{m} 27.8^{s}	+36° 48′ 07″	14.9	
733			Star	Triangulum	01^{h} 56^{m} 24.7^{s}	+33° 03′ 55″		
734			Spiral galaxy	Cetus	01^{h} 54^{m} 29.5^{s}	−16° 42′ 28″	15	
735			Spiral galaxy	Triangulum	01^{h} 56^{m} 38.0^{s}	+34° 10′ 37″	13.9	
736			Elliptical galaxy	Triangulum	01^{h} 56^{m} 41.0^{s}	+33° 02′ 37″	13.6	
737			Star	Triangulum	01^{h} 57^{m}	+33° 03′		
738			Galaxy	Triangulum	01^{h} 56^{m} 45.7^{s}	+33° 03′ 30″	15.5	
739			Lenticular galaxy	Triangulum	01^{h} 56^{m} 54.7^{s}	+33° 16′ 00″	14.8	
740			Spiral galaxy	Triangulum	01^{h} 56^{m} 55.1^{s}	+33° 00′ 55″	14.9	
741			Elliptical galaxy	Pisces	01^{h} 56^{m} 21.1^{s}	+05° 37′ 43″	13.2	
742			Elliptical galaxy	Pisces	01^{h} 56^{m} 24.2^{s}	+05° 37′ 36″	14.8	
743			Open cluster	Cassiopeia	01^{h} 59^{m}	+60° 11′		
744			Open cluster	Perseus	01^{h} 59^{m}	+55° 28′	8.4	
745			Interacting galaxies	Eridanus	01^{h} 54^{m} 08.7^{s}	−56° 41′ 27″	14.0	
746			Irregular galaxy	Andromeda	01^{h} 57^{m} 51.0^{s}	+44° 55′ 05″	13.8	
747			Spiral galaxy	Cetus	01^{h} 57^{m} 30.4^{s}	−09° 27′ 44″	14	
748			Spiral galaxy	Cetus	01^{h} 56^{m} 22.8^{s}	−04° 28′ 03″	12	
749			Spiral galaxy	Fornax	01^{h} 55^{m} 40.9^{s}	−29° 55′ 16″		
750			Elliptical galaxy	Triangulum	01^{h} 57^{m} 32.8^{s}	+33° 12′ 34″	12.9	
751			Elliptical galaxy	Triangulum	01^{h} 57^{m} 33.0^{s}	+33° 12′ 11″	12.9	
752			Open cluster	Andromeda	01^{h} 57^{m} 41^{s}	+37° 47′	6.5	
753			Spiral galaxy	Andromeda	01^{h} 57^{m} 42.5^{s}	+35° 54′ 55″	12.6	
754			Elliptical galaxy	Eridanus	01^{h} 54^{m} 20.9^{s}	−56° 45′ 40″		
755			Spiral galaxy	Cetus	01^{h} 56^{m} 22.4^{s}	−09° 03′ 45″	13	
756			Lenticular galaxy	Cetus	01^{h} 54^{m} 29.5^{s}	−16° 42′ 28″	15	
757		(Duplicate of NGC 731)	Elliptical galaxy	Cetus	01^{h} 54^{m} 56.9^{s}	−09° 00′ 47″	13	
758			Galaxy	Cetus	01^{h} 55^{m} 42.1^{s}	−03° 03′ 59″	15.1	
759			Elliptical galaxy	Andromeda	01^{h} 57^{m} 50.5^{s}	+36° 20′ 35″	13.7	
760			Double star	Triangulum	01^{h} 57^{m} 47.4^{s}	+33° 21′ 19″	14.5	
761			Spiral galaxy	Triangulum	01^{h} 57^{m} 49.6^{s}	+33° 22′ 37″	14.5	
762			Spiral galaxy	Cetus	01^{h} 56^{m} 57.7^{s}	−05° 24′ 12″	13.5	
763		(Duplicate of NGC 755)	Spiral galaxy	Cetus	01^{h} 56^{m} 22.4^{s}	−09° 03′ 45″	13	
764			Double star	Cetus	01^{h} 57^{m}	−16° 02′		
765			Spiral galaxy	Aries	01^{h} 58^{m} 48.1^{s}	+24° 53′ 32″	14.2	
766			Elliptical galaxy	Pisces	01^{h} 58^{m} 42.1^{s}	+08° 20′ 48″	14.4	
767			Spiral galaxy	Cetus	01^{h} 58^{m} 50.8^{s}	−09° 35′ 14″	14	
768			Spiral galaxy	Cetus	01^{h} 58^{m} 41.0^{s}	+00° 31′ 44″	14.3	
769			Spiral galaxy	Triangulum	01^{h} 59^{m} 36.2^{s}	+30° 54′ 36″	13.4	
770			Elliptical galaxy	Aries	01^{h} 59^{m} 13.8^{s}	+18° 57′ 17″	14.2	
771			Star	Cassiopeia	02^{h} 03^{m}	+72° 25′	3.95	
772			Spiral galaxy	Aries	01^{h} 59^{m} 19.7^{s}	+19° 00′ 28″	11.3	
773			Spiral galaxy	Cetus	01^{h} 58^{m} 52.0^{s}	−11° 30′ 52″	14	
774			Lenticular galaxy	Aries	01^{h} 59^{m} 34.8^{s}	+14° 00′ 30″	14.4	
775			Spiral galaxy	Fornax	01^{h} 58^{m} 32.5^{s}	−26° 17′ 32″	12.9	
776			Spiral galaxy	Aries	01^{h} 59^{m} 54.6^{s}	+23° 38′ 41″	13.4	
777			Elliptical galaxy	Triangulum	02^{h} 00^{m} 15.0^{s}	+31° 25′ 46″	12.7	
778			Lenticular galaxy	Triangulum	02^{h} 00^{m} 19.5^{s}	+31° 18′ 46″	14.2	
779			Spiral galaxy	Cetus	01^{h} 59^{m} 42.3^{s}	−05° 57′ 47″	12	
780			Galaxy	Triangulum	02^{h} 00^{m} 35.3^{s}	+28° 13′ 30″	14.6	
781			Spiral galaxy	Aries	02^{h} 00^{m} 09.0^{s}	+12° 39′ 22″	14.0	
782			Spiral galaxy	Eridanus	01^{h} 57^{m} 37.8^{s}	−57° 47′ 24″	12.8	
783			Spiral galaxy	Triangulum	02^{h} 01^{m} 06.7^{s}	+31° 52′ 56″	12.8	
784			Irregular galaxy	Triangulum	02^{h} 01^{m} 17.1^{s}	+28° 50′ 14″	12.1	
785			Lenticular galaxy	Triangulum	02^{h} 01^{m} 39.9^{s}	+31° 49′ 40″	13.9	
786			Spiral galaxy	Aries	02^{h} 01^{m} 24.7^{s}	+15° 38′ 46″	14.3	
787			Spiral galaxy	Cetus	02^{h} 00^{m} 48.6^{s}	−09° 00′ 09″	13	
788			Spiral galaxy	Cetus	02^{h} 01^{m} 06.5^{s}	−06° 48′ 57″	13	
789			Spiral galaxy	Triangulum	02^{h} 02^{m} 26.1^{s}	+32° 04′ 18″	14.0	
790			Lenticular galaxy	Cetus	02^{h} 01^{m} 21.5^{s}	−05° 22′ 20″	13.5	
791			Elliptical galaxy	Pisces	02^{h} 01^{m} 44.4^{s}	+08° 29′ 59″	14.8	
792			Lenticular galaxy	Aries	02^{h} 02^{m} 15.4^{s}	+15° 42′ 44″	14.6	
793			Double star	Triangulum	02^{h} 03^{m}	+32° 00′		
794			Lenticular galaxy	Aries	02^{h} 02^{m} 29.5^{s}	+18° 22′ 22″	14.0	
795			Lenticular galaxy	Eridanus	01^{h} 59^{m} 49.1^{s}	−55° 49′ 28″		
796		(Located in Small Magellanic Cloud)	Open cluster	Hydrus	01^{h} 56^{m} 45^{s}	−74° 13′		
797			Interacting galaxies	Andromeda	02^{h} 03^{m} 27.9624^{s}	+38° 07′ 00.823″	13.1	
798			Elliptical galaxy	Triangulum	02^{h} 03^{m} 19.7^{s}	+32° 04′ 38″	14.7	
799			Spiral galaxy	Cetus	02^{h} 02^{m} 12.4^{s}	−00° 06′ 03″	14.2	
800			Spiral galaxy	Cetus	02^{h} 02^{m} 11.9^{s}	−00° 07′ 50″	14.7	

== 801–900 ==
NGC number	Image	Other names	Object type	Constellation	Right ascension (J2000)	Declination (J2000)	Apparent magnitude	Note
801			Spiral galaxy	Andromeda	02^{h} 03^{m} 45.1^{s}	+38° 15′ 33″	14.2	
802			Lenticular galaxy	Hydrus	01^{h} 59^{m} 05.5^{s}	−67° 52′ 11″		
803			Spiral galaxy	Aries	02^{h} 03^{m} 44.8^{s}	+16° 01′ 51″	13.5	
804			Lenticular galaxy	Triangulum	02^{h} 04^{m} 02.2^{s}	+30° 49′ 58″	14.7	
805			Lenticular galaxy	Triangulum	02^{h} 04^{m} 29.7^{s}	+28° 48′ 44″	14.7	
806			Spiral galaxy	Cetus	02^{h} 03^{m} 31.2^{s}	−09° 56′ 00″	14	
807			Elliptical galaxy	Triangulum	02^{h} 04^{m} 55.8^{s}	+28° 59′ 15″	13.8	
808			Spiral galaxy	Cetus	02^{h} 03^{m} 56.6^{s}	−23° 18′ 45″	14.3	
809			Lenticular galaxy	Cetus	02^{h} 04^{m} 19.0^{s}	−08° 44′ 07″	14	
810			Interacting galaxies	Aries	02^{h} 05^{m} 28.6^{s}	+13° 15′ 03″	15.4	
811			Spiral galaxy	Cetus	02^{h} 04^{m} 35.0^{s}	−10° 06′ 32″	14.0	
812			Spiral galaxy	Andromeda	02^{h} 06^{m} 51.6^{s}	+44° 34′ 19″	12.8	
813			Lenticular galaxy	Hydrus	02^{h} 01^{m} 36.9^{s}	−68° 26′ 27″	14.6	
814			Lenticular galaxy	Cetus	02^{h} 10^{m} 37.6^{s}	−15° 46′ 25″		
815			Interacting galaxies	Cetus	02^{h} 02^{m} 54.2^{s}	−14° 40′ 25″	15.1	
816			Galaxy	Triangulum	02^{h} 08^{m} 08.9^{s}	+29° 15′ 21″	15.3	
817			Spiral galaxy	Aries	02^{h} 07^{m} 33.8^{s}	+17° 12′ 08″	13.9	
818			Spiral galaxy	Andromeda	02^{h} 08^{m} 44.7^{s}	+38° 46′ 38″	12.7	
819			Spiral galaxy	Triangulum	02^{h} 08^{m} 34.6^{s}	+29° 14′ 00″	14.1	
820			Spiral galaxy	Aries	02^{h} 08^{m} 25.0^{s}	+14° 20′ 58″	13.7	
821			Elliptical galaxy	Aries	02^{h} 08^{m} 21.0^{s}	+10° 59′ 41″	12.6	
822			Elliptical galaxy	Phoenix	02^{h} 06^{m} 38.9^{s}	−41° 09′ 25″	13	
823			Lenticular galaxy	Fornax	02^{h} 07^{m} 20.1^{s}	−25° 26′ 30″	13.6	
824			Spiral galaxy	Fornax	02^{h} 06^{m} 53.1^{s}	−36° 27′ 08″	13	
825			Spiral galaxy	Cetus	02^{h} 08^{m} 32.4^{s}	+06° 19′ 25″	14.5	
826			Galaxy	Triangulum	02^{h} 09^{m} 25.2^{s}	+30° 44′ 22″	15.4	
827			Spiral galaxy	Cetus	02^{h} 08^{m} 56.4^{s}	+07° 58′ 16″	14.0	
828			Spiral galaxy	Andromeda	02^{h} 10^{m} 09.57^{s}	+39° 11′ 25.3″	12.3	
829			Spiral galaxy	Cetus	02^{h} 08^{m} 42.2^{s}	−07° 47′ 27″	14	
830			Lenticular galaxy	Cetus	02^{h} 08^{m} 58.7^{s}	−07° 46′ 00″	15.0	
831			Spiral galaxy	Cetus	02^{h} 09^{m} 34.6^{s}	+06° 05′ 46″	15.2	
832			Double star	Triangulum	02^{h} 10^{m}	+35° 32′		
833			Spiral galaxy	Cetus	02^{h} 09^{m} 20.9^{s}	−10° 08′ 00″	14	
834			Spiral galaxy	Andromeda	02^{h} 11^{m} 01.5^{s}	+37° 39′ 60″	13.2	
835			Spiral galaxy	Cetus	02^{h} 09^{m} 24.7^{s}	−10° 08′ 11″	13.5	
836			Spiral galaxy	Cetus	02^{h} 10^{m} 24.9^{s}	−22° 03′ 18″	13.7	
837			Spiral galaxy	Cetus	02^{h} 10^{m} 16.2^{s}	−22° 25′ 51″		
838			Lenticular galaxy	Cetus	02^{h} 09^{m} 38.6^{s}	−10° 08′ 49″	14.0	
839			Spiral galaxy	Cetus	02^{h} 09^{m} 42.9^{s}	−10° 11′ 03″	13.7	
840			Spiral galaxy	Cetus	02^{h} 10^{m} 16.3^{s}	+07° 50′ 41″	14.7	
841			Spiral galaxy	Andromeda	02^{h} 11^{m} 17.5^{s}	+37° 29′ 49″	12.8	
842			Lenticular galaxy	Cetus	02^{h} 09^{m} 50.8^{s}	−07° 45′ 45″	14	
843			Triple star	Triangulum	02^{h} 11^{m} 08^{s}	+32° 06′		
844			Galaxy	Cetus	02^{h} 10^{m} 11.9^{s}	+06° 02′ 54″	15.0	
845			Spiral galaxy	Andromeda	02^{h} 12^{m} 19.8^{s}	+37° 28′ 38″	14.5	
846			Spiral galaxy	Andromeda	02^{h} 12^{m} 12.6^{s}	+44° 34′ 05″	13.2	
847		Duplicate of NGC 846	Spiral galaxy	Andromeda	02^{h} 12^{m} 12.6^{s}	+44° 34′ 05″	13.2	
848			Spiral galaxy	Cetus	02^{h} 10^{m} 17.6^{s}	−10° 19′ 17″	15.0	
849			Lenticular galaxy	Cetus	02^{h} 10^{m} 11.2^{s}	−22° 19′ 23″	15.7	
850			Lenticular galaxy	Cetus	02^{h} 11^{m} 13.6^{s}	−01° 29′ 08″	14.1	
851			Lenticular galaxy	Cetus	02^{h} 11^{m} 12.2^{s}	+03° 46′ 46″	14.7	
852			Spiral galaxy	Eridanus	02^{h} 08^{m} 55.4^{s}	−56° 44′ 11″		
853			Irregular galaxy	Cetus	02^{h} 11^{m} 41.6^{s}	−09° 18′ 17″	13	
854			Spiral galaxy	Fornax	02^{h} 11^{m} 30.8^{s}	−35° 50′ 05″	13	
855			Elliptical galaxy	Triangulum	02^{h} 14^{m} 03.7^{s}	+27° 52′ 37″	13.0	
856			Spiral galaxy	Cetus	02^{h} 13^{m} 38.5^{s}	−00° 43′ 03″	14.4	
857			Lenticular galaxy	Fornax	02^{h} 12^{m} 37.2^{s}	−31° 56′ 40″	13.3	
858			Spiral galaxy	Cetus	02^{h} 12^{m} 30.2^{s}	−22° 28′ 18″	14.0	
859			Spiral galaxy	Cetus	02^{h} 13^{m} 38.5^{s}	−00° 43′ 03″	14.4	
860			Elliptical galaxy	Triangulum	02^{h} 15^{m} 00.2^{s}	+30° 46′ 44″	15.1	
861			Spiral galaxy	Triangulum	02^{h} 15^{m} 51.2^{s}	+35° 54′ 48″	14.8	
862			Elliptical galaxy	Phoenix	02^{h} 13^{m} 02.8^{s}	−42° 02′ 02″	13.7	
863			Spiral galaxy	Cetus	02^{h} 14^{m} 33.6^{s}	−00° 46′ 00″	14.0	
864			Spiral galaxy	Cetus	02^{h} 15^{m} 27.6^{s}	+06° 00′ 09″	12.0	
865			Spiral galaxy	Triangulum	02^{h} 16^{m} 15.2^{s}	+28° 36′ 01″	14.0	
866		(Duplicate of NGC 863)	Spiral galaxy	Cetus	02^{h} 14^{m} 33.6^{s}	−00° 46′ 00″	14.0	
867			Lenticular galaxy	Cetus	02^{h} 17^{m} 04.8^{s}	+01° 14′ 39″	14.2	
868			Spiral galaxy	Cetus	02^{h} 15^{m} 58.4^{s}	−00° 42′ 48″	15.6	
869		h Persei Cluster	Open cluster	Perseus	02^{h} 19^{m}	+57° 09′	5.7	
870			Galaxy	Aries	02^{h} 17^{m} 09.2^{s}	+14° 31′ 22″	16	
871			Spiral galaxy	Aries	02^{h} 17^{m} 10.8^{s}	+14° 32′ 53″	13.6	
872			Spiral galaxy	Cetus	02^{h} 15^{m} 25.2^{s}	−17° 46′ 52″		
873			Spiral galaxy	Cetus	02^{h} 16^{m} 32.3^{s}	−11° 20′ 55″	13.8	
874			Spiral galaxy	Cetus	02^{h} 16^{m} 02.0^{s}	−23° 18′ 21″		
875			Lenticular galaxy	Cetus	02^{h} 17^{m} 04.8^{s}	+01° 14′ 39″	14.2	
876			Spiral galaxy	Aries	02^{h} 17^{m} 53.3^{s}	+14° 31′ 17″	16.5	
877			Spiral galaxy	Aries	02^{h} 17^{m} 59.7^{s}	+14° 32′ 38″	12.5	
878			Spiral galaxy	Cetus	02^{h} 17^{m} 54.2^{s}	−23° 23′ 04″	14.8	
879			Irregular galaxy	Cetus	02^{h} 16^{m} 51.3^{s}	−08° 57′ 48″	15.5	
880			Irregular galaxy	Cetus	02^{h} 18^{m} 27.1^{s}	−04° 12′ 22″	15.6	
881			Spiral galaxy	Cetus	02^{h} 18^{m} 45.4^{s}	−06° 38′ 22″	12.5	
882			Lenticular galaxy	Aries	02^{h} 19^{m} 40.0^{s}	+15° 48′ 50″	14.9	
883			Lenticular galaxy	Cetus	02^{h} 19^{m} 05.2^{s}	−06° 47′ 29″	13	
884		Chi Persei Cluster	Open cluster	Perseus	02^{h} 22^{m}	+57° 08′	6.6	
885		(Duplicate of NGC 863)	Spiral galaxy	Cetus	02^{h} 14^{m} 33.6^{s}	−00° 46′ 00″	14.0	
886			Open cluster	Cassiopeia	02^{h} 24^{m}	+63° 46′		
887			Spiral galaxy	Cetus	02^{h} 19^{m} 32^{s}	−16° 04′	13	
888			Elliptical galaxy	Horologium	02^{h} 17^{m} 26.9^{s}	−59° 51′ 40″		
889			Elliptical galaxy	Phoenix	02^{h} 19^{m} 06.9^{s}	−41° 44′ 58″	14.2	
890			Lenticular galaxy	Triangulum	02^{h} 22^{m} 00.9^{s}	+33° 15′ 59″	12.6	
891			Spiral galaxy	Andromeda	02^{h} 22^{m} 32.9^{s}	+42° 20′ 46″	10.8	
892			Spiral galaxy	Cetus	02^{h} 20^{m} 52.0^{s}	−23° 06′ 50″		
893			Spiral galaxy	Phoenix	02^{h} 19^{m} 57.8^{s}	−41° 24′ 09″	13.5	
894		(Northwestern arm of NGC 895)	Spiral arm	Cetus	02^{h} 21^{m} 36.2^{s}	−05° 31′ 13″	11.5	
895			Spiral galaxy	Cetus	02^{h} 21^{m} 36.2^{s}	−05° 31′ 13″	11.5	
896		Heart Nebula; Sharpless 2-190	Diffuse nebula	Cassiopeia	02^{h} 26^{m}	+61° 59′	18.3	
897			Spiral galaxy	Fornax	02^{h} 21^{m} 06.1^{s}	−33° 43′ 18″	11	
898			Spiral galaxy	Andromeda	02^{h} 23^{m} 20.3^{s}	+41° 57′ 04″	13.8	
899			Irregular galaxy	Cetus	02^{h} 21^{m} 53.2^{s}	−20° 49′ 22″	13.3	
900			Lenticular galaxy	Aries	02^{h} 23^{m} 32.3^{s}	+26° 30′ 41″	15.0	

== 901–1000 ==
NGC number	Image	Other names	Object type	Constellation	Right ascension (J2000)	Declination (J2000)	Apparent magnitude	Note
901			Elliptical galaxy	Aries	02^{h} 23^{m} 34.1^{s}	+26° 33′ 25″		
902			Spiral galaxy	Cetus	02^{h} 22^{m} 21.8^{s}	−16° 40′ 45″	14	
903			Lenticular galaxy	Aries	02^{h} 24^{m} 00.9^{s}	+27° 21′ 23″		
904			Elliptical galaxy	Aries	02^{h} 24^{m} 05.7^{s}	+27° 20′ 32″	15.0	
905			Lenticular galaxy	Cetus	02^{h} 22^{m} 43.6^{s}	−08° 43′ 09″	15.9	
906			Spiral galaxy	Andromeda	02^{h} 25^{m} 16.2^{s}	+42° 05′ 25″	14.4	
907			Irregular galaxy	Cetus	02^{h} 23^{m} 01.9^{s}	−20° 42′ 43″	14.2	
908			Spiral galaxy	Cetus	02^{h} 23^{m} 04.8^{s}	−21° 14′ 03″	10.9	
909			Elliptical galaxy	Andromeda	02^{h} 25^{m} 22.8^{s}	+42° 02′ 06″	14.5	
910			Elliptical galaxy	Andromeda	02^{h} 25^{m} 26.8^{s}	+41° 49′ 27″	14.5	
911			Elliptical galaxy	Andromeda	02^{h} 25^{m} 42.4^{s}	+41° 57′ 21″	14.0	
912			Elliptical galaxy	Andromeda	02^{h} 25^{m} 42.7^{s}	+41° 46′ 39″	15.0	
913			Elliptical galaxy	Andromeda	02^{h} 25^{m} 44.8^{s}	+41° 47′ 58″	16.0	
914			Spiral galaxy	Andromeda	02^{h} 26^{m} 05.1^{s}	+42° 08′ 38″	13.9	
915			Galaxy	Aries	02^{h} 25^{m} 45.6^{s}	+27° 13′ 16″	15.0	
916			Galaxy	Aries	02^{h} 25^{m} 47.6^{s}	+27° 14′ 33″	14.9	
917			Spiral galaxy	Triangulum	02^{h} 26^{m} 07.8^{s}	+31° 54′ 43″	14.5	
918			Spiral galaxy	Aries	02^{h} 25^{m} 50.8^{s}	+18° 29′ 47″	14.3	
919			Spiral galaxy	Aries	02^{h} 26^{m} 16.8^{s}	+27° 12′ 43″	15.5	
920			Spiral galaxy	Andromeda	02^{h} 27^{m} 51.9^{s}	+45° 56′ 49″	15.6	
921			Spiral galaxy	Cetus	02^{h} 26^{m} 33.5^{s}	−15° 50′ 51″	14	
922			Spiral galaxy	Fornax	02^{h} 25^{m} 03.5^{s}	−24° 47′ 22″	12.6	
923			Spiral galaxy	Andromeda	02^{h} 27^{m} 34.7^{s}	+41° 58′ 40″	14.4	
924			Lenticular galaxy	Aries	02^{h} 26^{m} 46.9^{s}	+20° 29′ 51″	13.8	
925			Spiral galaxy	Triangulum	02^{h} 27^{m} 16.8^{s}	+33° 34′ 45″	10.5	
926			Spiral galaxy	Cetus	02^{h} 26^{m} 06.8^{s}	−00° 19′ 56″	13.9	
927			Spiral galaxy	Aries	02^{h} 26^{m} 37.4^{s}	+12° 09′ 18″	14.5	
928			Spiral galaxy	Aries	02^{h} 27^{m} 40.9^{s}	+27° 13′ 15″	14.7	
929			Spiral galaxy	Cetus	02^{h} 27^{m} 18.3^{s}	−12° 05′ 11″	15	
930			Unknown	Aries	02^{h} 28^{m}	+20° 20′		
931			Spiral galaxy	Triangulum	02^{h} 28^{m} 14.6^{s}	+31° 18′ 39″	13.9	
932			Spiral galaxy	Aries	02^{h} 27^{m} 54.8^{s}	+20° 19′ 57″	13.7	
933			Spiral galaxy	Andromeda	02^{h} 29^{m} 17.7^{s}	+45° 54′ 40″	15.5	
934			Lenticular galaxy	Cetus	02^{h} 27^{m} 33.0^{s}	−00° 14′ 40″	14.4	
935			Spiral galaxy	Aries	02^{h} 28^{m} 11.2^{s}	+19° 35′ 59″	13.6	
936			Lenticular galaxy	Cetus	02^{h} 27^{m} 37.3^{s}	−01° 09′ 23″	11.3	
937			Spiral galaxy	Andromeda	02^{h} 29^{m} 28.3^{s}	+42° 14′ 59″	15.0	
938			Elliptical galaxy	Aries	02^{h} 28^{m} 33.6^{s}	+20° 17′ 02″	13.8	
939			Elliptical galaxy	Eridanus	02^{h} 26^{m} 21.2^{s}	−44° 26′ 47″	14	
940			Lenticular galaxy	Triangulum	02^{h} 29^{m} 27.5^{s}	+31° 38′ 28″	13.4	
941			Spiral galaxy	Cetus	02^{h} 28^{m} 27.9^{s}	−01° 09′ 04″	13.4	
942			Irregular galaxy	Cetus	02^{h} 29^{m} 11.0^{s}	−10° 49′ 36″	14	
943			Lenticular galaxy	Cetus	02^{h} 29^{m} 09.6^{s}	−10° 49′ 42″	14	
944			Lenticular galaxy	Cetus	02^{h} 26^{m} 42.1^{s}	−14° 30′ 55″	14	
945			Spiral galaxy	Cetus	02^{h} 28^{m} 37.2^{s}	−10° 32′ 23″	12	
946			Lenticular galaxy	Andromeda	02^{h} 30^{m} 38.6^{s}	+42° 13′ 56″	14.5	
947			Spiral galaxy	Cetus	02^{h} 28^{m} 32.8^{s}	−19° 02′ 33″	12.9	
948			Spiral galaxy	Cetus	02^{h} 28^{m} 45.1^{s}	−10° 30′ 44″	14	
949			Spiral galaxy	Triangulum	02^{h} 30^{m} 48.8^{s}	+37° 08′ 10″	12.0	
950			Spiral galaxy	Cetus	02^{h} 29^{m} 12.4^{s}	−11° 01′ 36″	14	
951			Spiral galaxy	Cetus	02^{h} 28^{m} 56.9^{s}	−22° 20′ 55″		
952			Unknown	Triangulum	02^{h} 31^{m}	+34° 45′		
953			Elliptical galaxy	Triangulum	02^{h} 31^{m} 09.9^{s}	+29° 35′ 19″	14.5	
954			Spiral galaxy	Eridanus	02^{h} 28^{m} 51.4^{s}	−41° 24′ 10″	13.3	
955			Spiral galaxy	Cetus	02^{h} 30^{m} 33.4^{s}	−01° 06′ 31″	13.0	
956			Open cluster	Andromeda	02^{h} 32^{m}	+44° 39′	8.9	
957			Open cluster	Perseus	02^{h} 33^{m}	+57° 34′	8.3	
958			Barred spiral galaxy	Cetus	02^{h} 30^{m} 42.83^{s}	−02° 56′ 20.4″	12.2	
959			Irregular galaxy	Triangulum	02^{h} 32^{m} 24.1^{s}	+35° 29′ 41″	12.5	
960			Spiral galaxy	Cetus	02^{h} 31^{m} 41.4^{s}	−09° 18′ 02″	14	
961			Irregular galaxy	Cetus	02^{h} 41^{m} 02.5^{s}	−06° 56′ 09″	13	
962			Elliptical galaxy	Aries	02^{h} 32^{m} 40.0^{s}	+28° 04′ 12″	14.2	
963			Galaxy	Cetus	02^{h} 30^{m} 31.2^{s}	−04° 13′ 00″	14.5	
964			Spiral galaxy	Fornax	02^{h} 31^{m} 06.2^{s}	−36° 01′ 60″	12.5	
965			Spiral galaxy	Cetus	02^{h} 32^{m} 25.0^{s}	−18° 38′ 23″	14.3	
966			Lenticular galaxy	Cetus	02^{h} 31^{m} 46.9^{s}	−19° 52′ 52″	14.1	
967			Lenticular galaxy	Cetus	02^{h} 32^{m} 12.7^{s}	−17° 13′ 01″	13.7	
968			Elliptical galaxy	Triangulum	02^{h} 34^{m} 06.3^{s}	+34° 28′ 47″	13.8	
969			Lenticular galaxy	Triangulum	02^{h} 34^{m} 08.0^{s}	+32° 56′ 50″	13.4	
970			Interacting galaxies	Triangulum	02^{h} 34^{m} 11.8^{s}	+32° 58′ 39″	15.7	
971			Star	Triangulum	02^{h} 34^{m} 11.6^{s}	+32° 58′ 36″		
972			Spiral galaxy	Aries	02^{h} 34^{m} 13.4^{s}	+29° 18′ 38″	12.1	
973			Spiral galaxy	Triangulum	02^{h} 34^{m} 20.2^{s}	+32° 30′ 19″	13.7	
974			Spiral galaxy	Triangulum	02^{h} 34^{m} 25.8^{s}	+32° 57′ 16″	13.9	
975			Spiral galaxy	Cetus	02^{h} 33^{m} 22.8^{s}	+09° 36′ 06″	14.2	
976			Spiral galaxy	Aries	02^{h} 34^{m} 00.1^{s}	+20° 58′ 37″	12.9	
977			Spiral galaxy	Cetus	02^{h} 33^{m} 03.4^{s}	−10° 45′ 36″	13	
978			Interacting galaxies	Triangulum	02^{h} 34^{m} 47.1^{s}	+32° 50′ 46″	13.3	
979			Lenticular galaxy	Eridanus	02^{h} 31^{m} 38.6^{s}	−44° 31′ 26″	13.8	
980			Lenticular galaxy	Andromeda	02^{h} 35^{m} 18.7^{s}	+40° 55′ 35″	14.3	
981			Spiral galaxy	Cetus	02^{h} 32^{m} 59.9^{s}	−10° 58′ 31″	14	
982			Spiral galaxy	Andromeda	02^{h} 35^{m} 24.9^{s}	+40° 52′ 09″	13.2	
983		Duplicate of NGC 1002	Spiral galaxy	Triangulum	02^{h} 38^{m} 55.8^{s}	+34° 37′ 20″	14.0	
984			Lenticular galaxy	Aries	02^{h} 34^{m} 43.3^{s}	+23° 24′ 46″	14.5	
985			Ring galaxy	Cetus	02^{h} 34^{m} 37.8^{s}	−08° 47′ 15″	14.5	
986			Spiral galaxy	Fornax	02^{h} 33^{m} 34.2^{s}	−39° 02′ 40″	11.8	
987			Spiral galaxy	Triangulum	02^{h} 36^{m} 49.6^{s}	+33° 19′ 38″	13.4	
988			Spiral galaxy	Cetus	02^{h} 35^{m} 27.4^{s}	−09° 21′ 17″	11.4	
989			Galaxy	Cetus	02^{h} 33^{m} 46.1^{s}	−16° 30′ 40″	15	
990			Elliptical galaxy	Aries	02^{h} 36^{m} 18.3^{s}	+11° 38′ 31″	13.9	
991			Spiral galaxy	Cetus	02^{h} 35^{m} 32.9^{s}	−07° 09′ 17″	13.4	
992			Spiral galaxy	Aries	02^{h} 37^{m} 25.6^{s}	+21° 06′ 01″	13.5	
993			Lenticular galaxy	Cetus	02^{h} 36^{m} 46.2^{s}	+02° 02′ 59″	14.9	
994		(Duplicate of NGC 993)	Lenticular galaxy	Cetus	02^{h} 36^{m} 46.2^{s}	+02° 02′ 59″	14.9	
995			Lenticular galaxy	Andromeda	02^{h} 38^{m} 32.2^{s}	+41° 31′ 45″	14.9	
996			Elliptical galaxy	Andromeda	02^{h} 38^{m} 40.0^{s}	+41° 38′ 49″	14.5	
997			Interacting galaxies	Cetus	02^{h} 37^{m} 14.4^{s}	+07° 18′ 20″	14.6	
998			Spiral galaxy	Cetus	02^{h} 37^{m} 20.3^{s}	+07° 26′ 24″	15.6	
999			Spiral galaxy	Andromeda	02^{h} 38^{m} 47.6^{s}	+41° 40′ 13″	14.5	
1000			Elliptical galaxy	Andromeda	02^{h} 38^{m} 49.7^{s}	+41° 27′ 35″	15.6	

== See also ==
- NGC
- UGC
- galaxy
- double star
- Lists of astronomical objects
- List of NGC objects
- List of NGC objects (1001-2000)
- List of NGC objects (2001-3000)
- List of NGC objects (3001-4000)
- List of NGC objects (4001-5000)
- List of NGC objects (5001-6000)
- List of NGC objects (6001-7000)
- List of NGC objects (7001-7840)
