= NGC 840 =

Barred spiral galaxy in the constellation Cetus

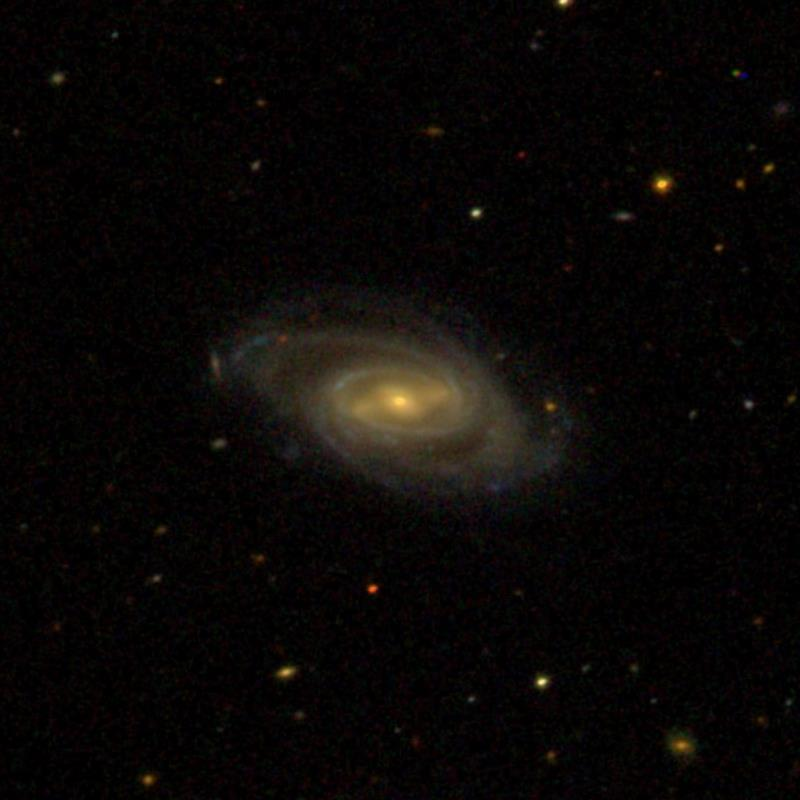
- SDSS image of NGC 840

Observation data (J2000 epoch)
- Constellation: Cetus
- Right ascension: 02^{h} 10^{m} 16.21932^{s}
- Declination: +07° 50′ 43.4000″
- Redshift: 0.024143
- Heliocentric radial velocity: 7151 km/s
- Distance: 303.0 Mly (92.90 Mpc)
- Apparent magnitude (V): 13.42
- Apparent magnitude (B): 14.30

Characteristics
- Type: SB(r)b

Other designations
- UGC 1664, MCG +01-06-049, PGC 8293

NGC 840 is a barred spiral galaxy in the constellation Cetus south of the ecliptic. It is estimated to be about 300 million light-years from the Milky Way and has a diameter of approximately 175,000 ly.

== See also ==
- List of NGC objects (1–1000)
