= NGC 657 =

Open cluster in the constellation of Cassiopeia

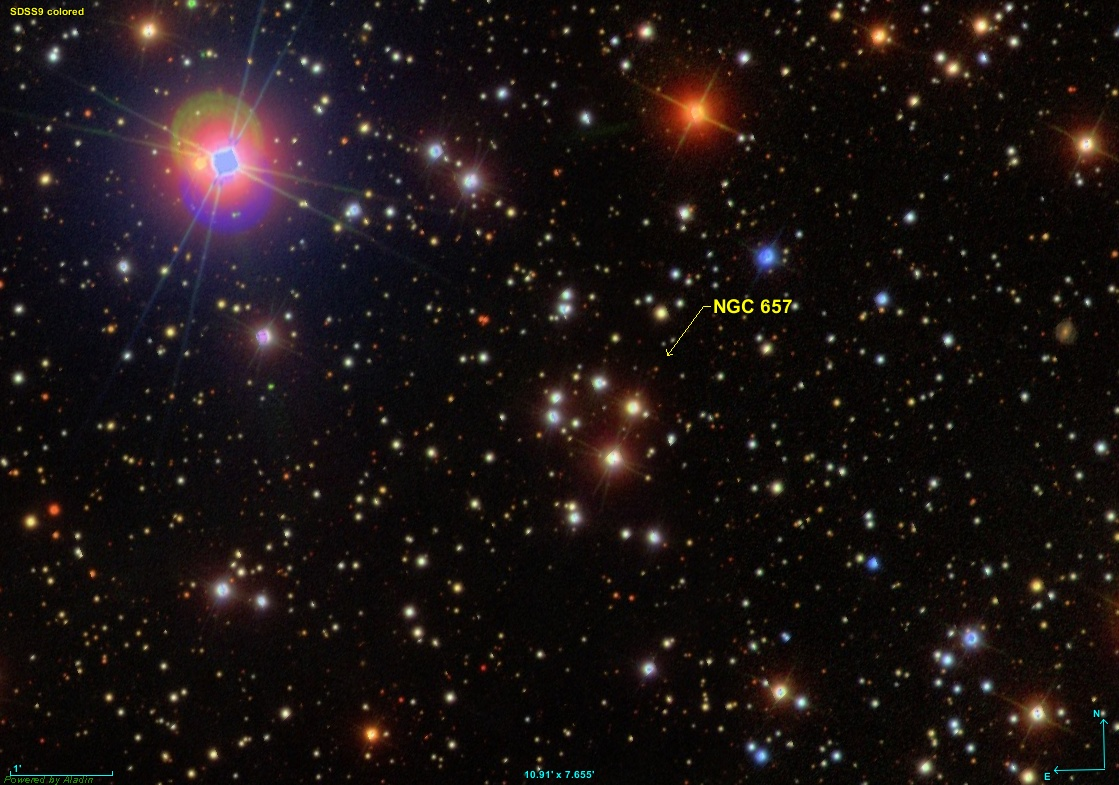
- NGC 657; Credit: Sloan Digital Sky Survey

Observation data (J2000 epoch)
- Right ascension: 1^{h} 43^{m} 23.76^{s}
- Declination: 55° 50^{m} 24^{s}
- Distance: 6308 ly (1934 pc)

Physical characteristics
- Estimated age: ~1 Gyr
- Other designations: C 0140+556, MWSC 135

Associations
- Constellation: Cassiopeia

NGC 657 is an open cluster containing very few stars or a group of stars located in the constellation Cassiopeia. It was discovered by British astronomer John Herschel in 1831.

== See also ==
- List of NGC objects (1–1000)
