= NGC 790 =

Galaxy in the constellation Cetus

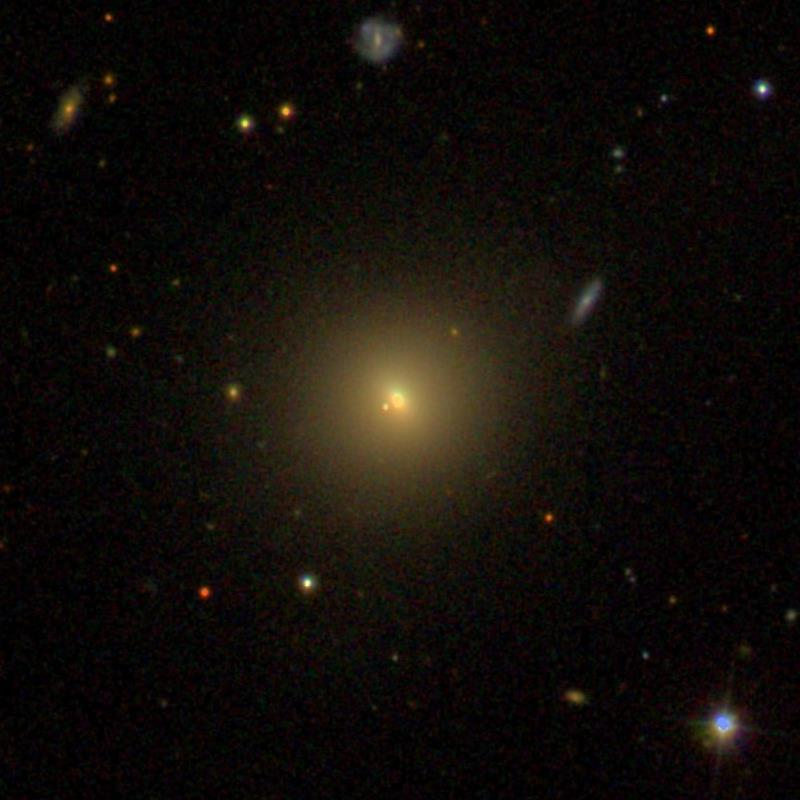
- SDSS image of NGC 790

Observation data (J2000 epoch)
- Constellation: Cetus
- Right ascension: 02^{h} 01^{m} 21.576^{s}
- Declination: −05° 22′ 15.77″
- Redshift: 0.017842
- Heliocentric radial velocity: 5301 km/s
- Distance: 232.3 Mly (71.22 Mpc)
- Apparent magnitude (B): 13.5

Characteristics
- Type: SA0^{0}(r)?

Other designations
- MCG -01-06-026, PGC 7677

NGC 790 is a lenticular galaxy in the constellation Cetus. It is estimated to be 233 million light-years from the Milky Way and has a diameter of approximately 90,000 light years. NGC 790 was discovered on September 10, 1785 by the German-British astronomer William Herschel.

== See also ==
- List of NGC objects (1–1000)
