= NGC 979 =

Galaxy in the constellation of Eridanus

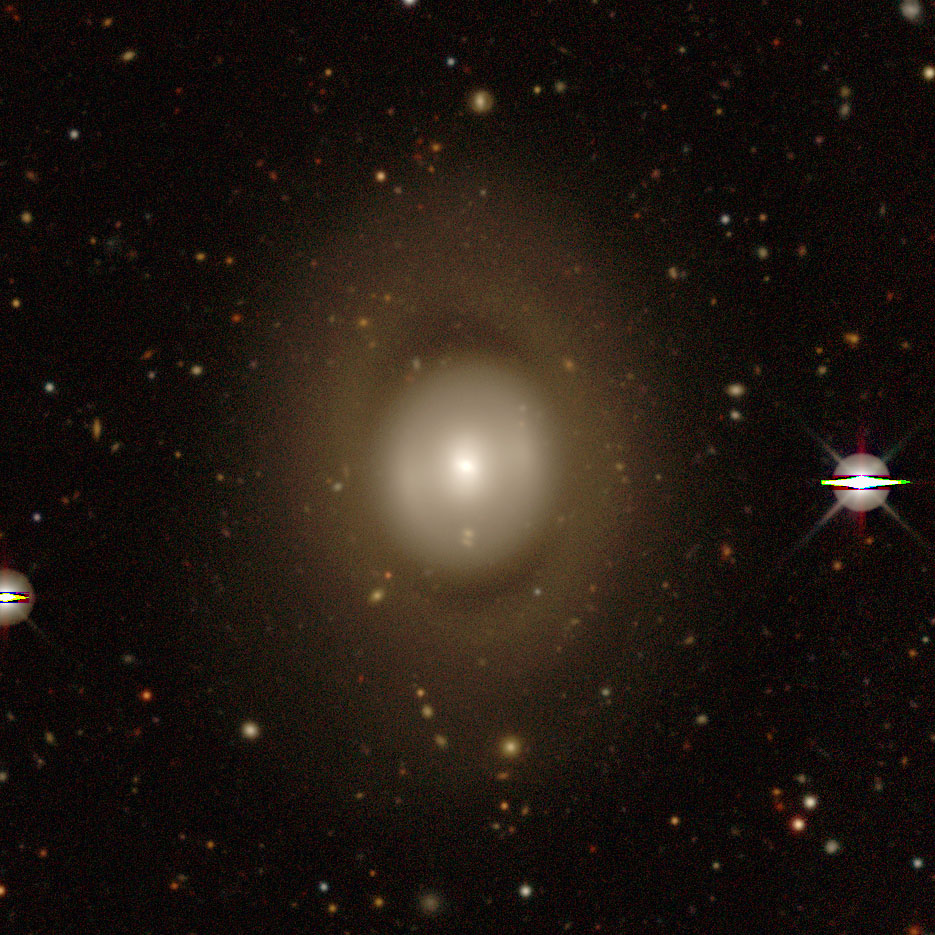
- The galaxy NGC 979 imaged with the 10th data release of the Legacy survey.

Observation data (J2000 epoch)
- Constellation: Eridanus
- Right ascension: 02^{h} 31^{m} 38.79^{s}
- Declination: −44° 31′ 27.5″
- Redshift: 0.015930
- Heliocentric radial velocity: 4738 km/s
- Distance: 173.19 Mly (53.100 Mpc)
- Apparent magnitude (B): 13.81

Characteristics
- Type: SB0

Other designations
- LEDA 9614, MCG -07-16-014

NGC 979 is a lenticular galaxy located within the constellation of Eridanus. This galaxy has a possible outer ring which is dim but smooth. This structure might be a polar ring. The featurelessness of this galaxy means that it is completely devoid of HII regions and consequently, star formation.

== See also ==
- List of NGC objects (1–1000)
