= NGC 106 =

Lenticular galaxy in the constellation Pisces

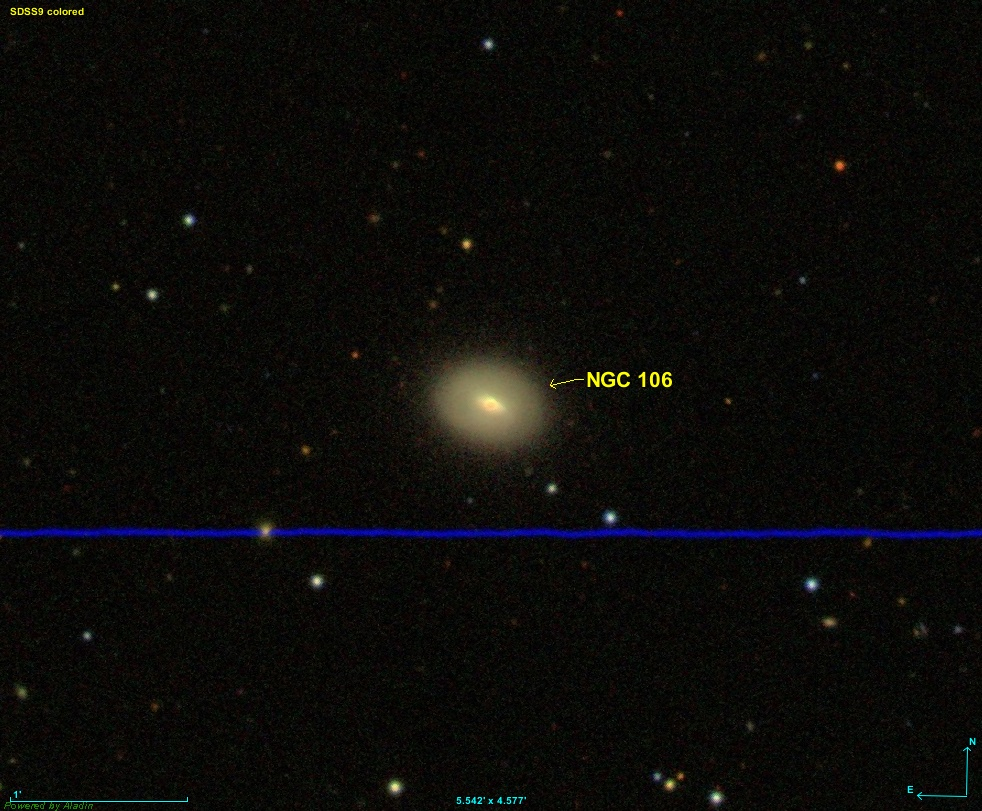
- SDSS image of NGC 106

Observation data (J2000 epoch)
- Constellation: Pisces
- Right ascension: 00^{h} 24^{m} 43.753^{s}
- Declination: −05° 08′ 55.71″
- Redshift: 0.020211
- Heliocentric radial velocity: 6059
- Distance: 199 Mly (61.1 Mpc)
- Apparent magnitude (B): 14.46

Characteristics
- Type: Sa: pec
- Size: 64,800 ly (19,880 pc) (Note: 2MASS K_{s} band used.)
- Apparent size (V): 1.3′ × 0.6′

Other designations
- PGC 1551, 2MASX J00244375-0508557

NGC 106 is a lenticular galaxy estimated to be about 270 million light-years away in the constellation of Pisces. It was discovered by Francis Leavenworth in 1886 and its apparent magnitude is 14.5.

== Notes ==
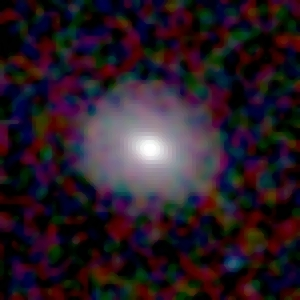
NGC 106 in infrared
