= NGC 743 =

Star cluster in the constellation Cassiopeia

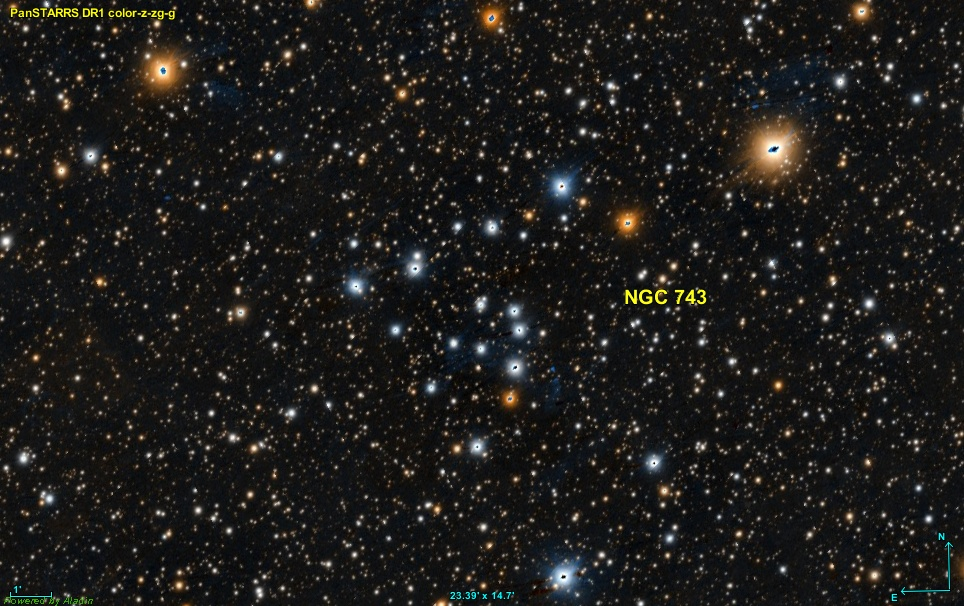
- The open cluster NGC 743

Observation data (J2000 epoch)
- Right ascension: 02^{h} 00^{m} 18^{s}
- Declination: +60° 17′ 20″
- Apparent magnitude (V): ?

Physical characteristics

Associations
- Constellation: Cassiopeia

NGC 743 (also known as C 0155+599) is a small open cluster located in the constellation Cassiopeia. It was discovered by 19th century English astronomer John Herschel on 29 September 1829 and has a visual magnitude of 10.58, and is moving towards the Sun with a radial velocity of -18.16 km/s±0.15. It is located approximately 3812.76 light years, (1169 pc), from the Earth.
