= NGC 852 =

Barred spiral galaxy in the constellation Eridanus

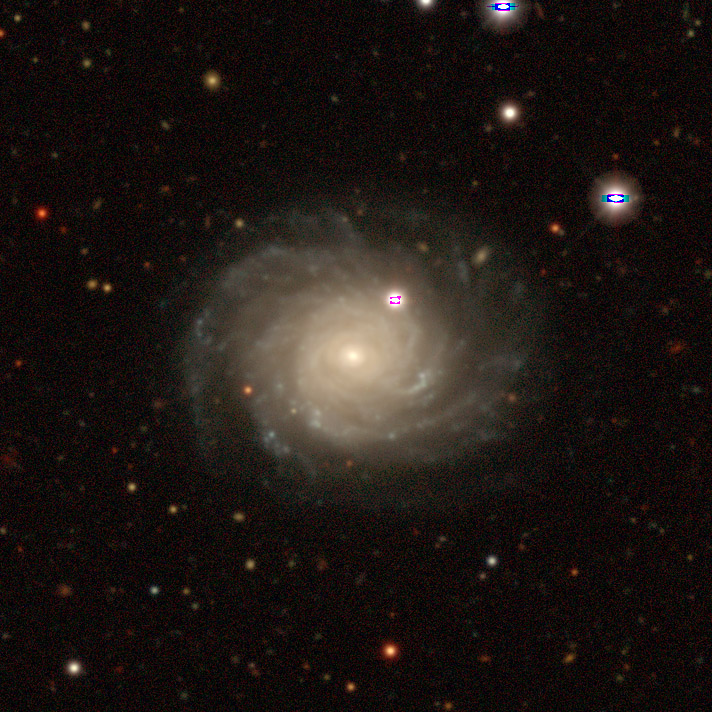
- NGC 852 imaged by the legacy surveys

Observation data (J2000 epoch)
- Constellation: Eridanus
- Right ascension: 02^{h} 08^{m} 55.446^{s}
- Declination: −56° 44′ 13.29″
- Redshift: 0.021656
- Heliocentric radial velocity: 6421.9

Characteristics
- Type: SB(rs)bc:
- Apparent size (V): 0.593′ × 0.546′

Other designations
- IRAS F02072-5658, LEDA 8195

NGC 852 is a barred spiral galaxy located in the constellation Eridanus. It is estimated to be 281 million light-years from the Milky Way and has a diameter of about 110,000 light-years. NGC 852 was discovered on October 27, 1834, by John Herschel.
