= NGC 102 =

Galaxy in the constellation Cetus

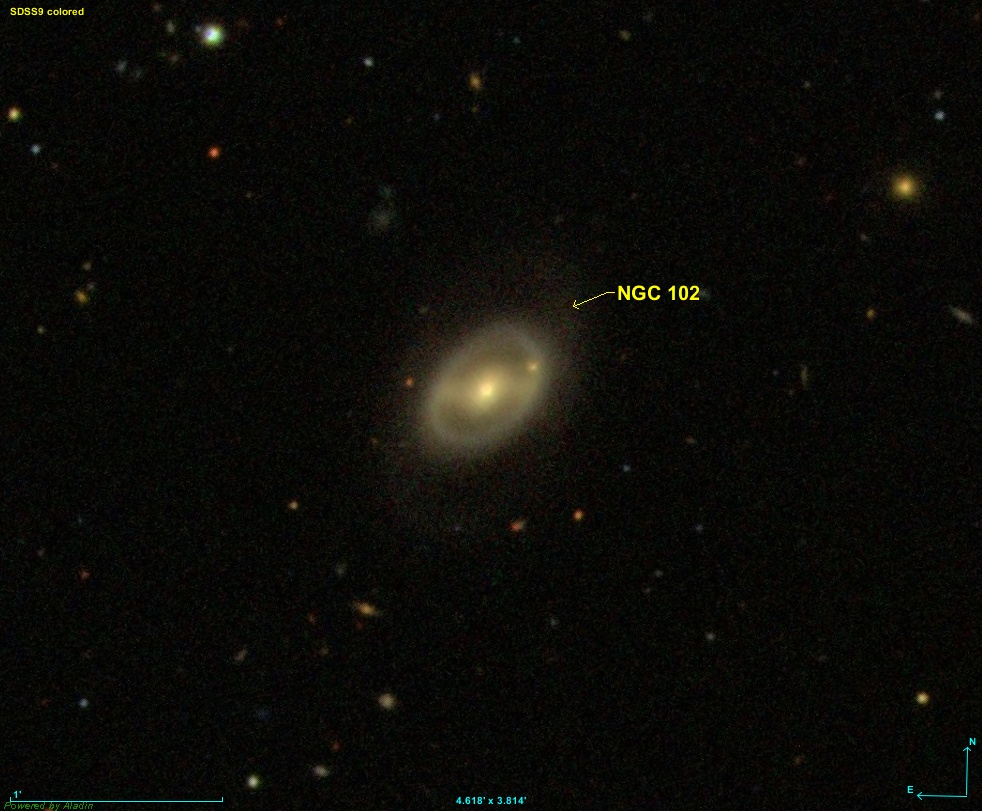
- SDSS image of NGC 102

Observation data (J2000 epoch)
- Constellation: Cetus
- Right ascension: 00^{h} 24^{m} 36.514^{s}
- Declination: −13° 57′ 22.92″
- Redshift: 0.024450
- Heliocentric radial velocity: 7330
- Distance: 328.70+63.86 −79.26 Mly (100.78+19.58 −24.30 Mpc)
- Apparent magnitude (B): 14

Characteristics
- Type: S0/a
- Apparent size (V): 1.0′ × 0.9′

Other designations
- MGC-02-02-011, PGC 1542

NGC 102 is a lenticular galaxy estimated to be about 330 million light-years away in the constellation of Cetus. It was discovered by Francis Leavenworth in 1886 and its apparent magnitude is 14.

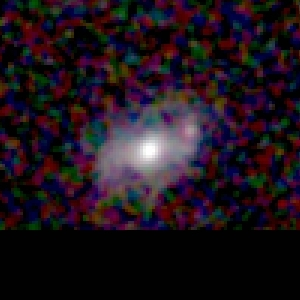
NGC 102 (2MASS)
