= NGC 717 =

Galaxy in constellation Andromeda

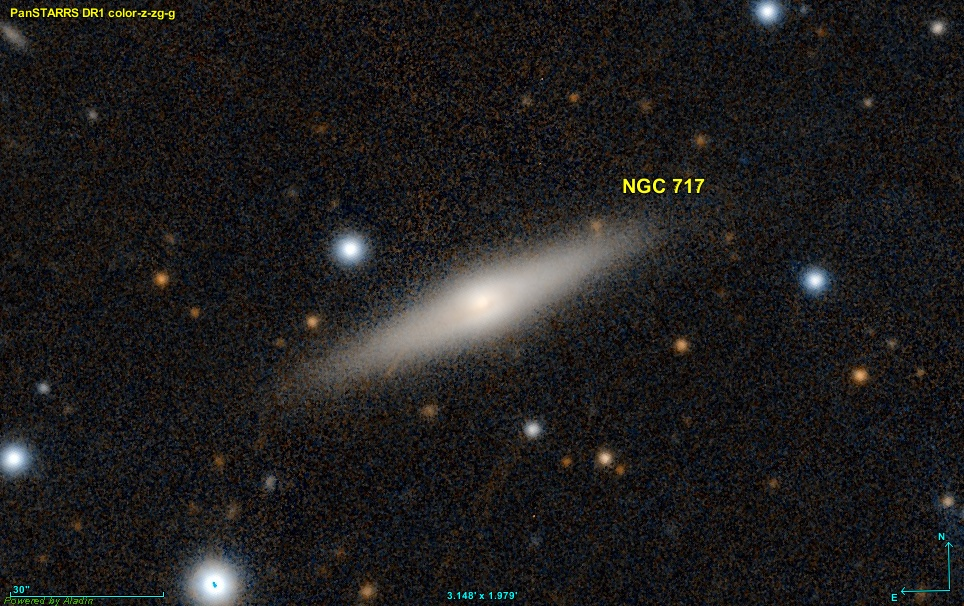
- Pan-STARRS image of NGC 717

Observation data (J2000 epoch)
- Constellation: Andromeda
- Right ascension: 01^{h} 53^{m} 55.1^{s}
- Declination: 36° 13′ 46″
- Redshift: 0.016571
- Heliocentric radial velocity: 4968 km/s
- Distance: 210 Mly (64.4 Mpc)
- Group or cluster: Abell 262
- Apparent magnitude (V): 14.86

Characteristics
- Type: S0/a
- Size: ~99,000 ly (30.4 kpc) (estimated)
- Apparent size (V): 1.3 x 0.2

Other designations
- MCG 6-5-41, PGC 7033, UGC 1363

NGC 717 is a lenticular galaxy located 210 million light-years away in the constellation Andromeda. The galaxy was discovered by astronomer Bindon Blood Stoney on October 28, 1850 and is a member of Abell 262.

== See also ==
- List of NGC objects (1–1000)
- NGC 714
