= 6560 =

6560 may refer to:

== Places ==
- 6560 Pravdo, Asteroid #6560, the asteroid Pravdo, the 6560th asteroid registered, a main-belt asteroid
- Alushta (area code 6560), Crimea, Ukraine, occupied by Russia; see List of dialling codes in Ukraine
- Omeo Highway (arterial road 6560), Victoria, Australia
- KGS #6560, Vufflens-la-Ville, Vaud, Switzerland; the Saint-Etienne Church; see List of cultural property of regional significance in Switzerland: Vaud
- NGC 6560, a spiral galaxy in the Constellation Hercules
- PGC 6560, a spiral galaxy in the Constellation Triangulum

== Product models ==
- Nokia 6560, a bar-style cellphone, a feature phone
- MOS Technology 6560, a video interface chip from MOS used in the Commodore VIC-20 home computer
- IBM model number 6560, the internal model number for the Model Name 340, a personal computer model, part of the IBM PC Series
- KamAZ 6560, a truck, an 8x8 chassis and cab; see List of Kamaz vehicles

== Other uses ==
- Southern Railway EMD NW2 #6560, a train locomotive
- First Air Flight 6560 (20 August 2011), a 737 that crashed at Resolute, Nunavut, Canada
- a number in the 6000s number range
- a year in the 7th millennium AD
- a year in the 7th millennium BC

== See also ==
- 656 (number)
