= NGC 753 =

Galaxy in the constellation Andromeda

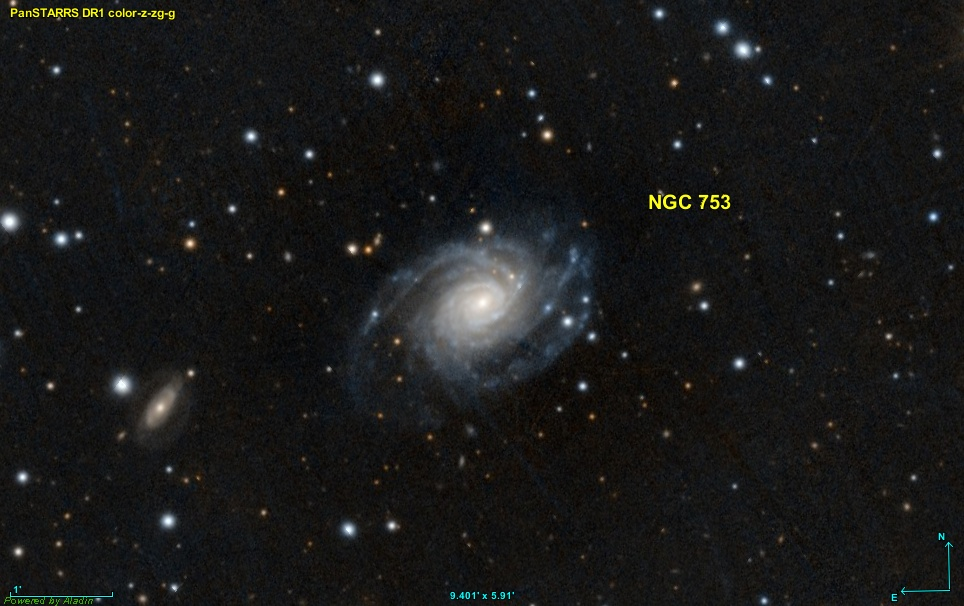
- Pan-STARRS image of NGC 753

Observation data (J2000 epoch)
- Constellation: Andromeda
- Right ascension: 01^{h} 57^{m} 42.2104^{s}
- Declination: +35° 54′ 58.262″
- Redshift: 0.016221
- Heliocentric radial velocity: 4863 km/s
- Distance: 220 Mly (67 Mpc)
- Group or cluster: Abell 262
- Apparent magnitude (V): 12.97

Characteristics
- Type: SAB(rs)bc
- Size: ~148,000 ly (45.39 kpc) (estimated)
- Apparent size (V): 2.5′ × 1.9′

Other designations
- IRAS 01547+3540, UGC 1437, MCG +06-05-066, PGC 7387, CGCG 522-086

NGC 753 is a spiral galaxy located 220 million light-years away in the constellation Andromeda. The galaxy was discovered by astronomer by Heinrich d'Arrest on September 16, 1865 and is a member of Abell 262.

NGC 753 has roughly 2-3 times more mass than the Milky Way and is classified as a radio galaxy.

== Physical characteristics ==
NGC 753 contains two main arms that extend to 180° on either side of the galaxy. From the two main arms, there are three larger and weaker arms that sub-divide into several branches. This open structure of the arms may be due to the influence of NGC 759 which is a close companion of NGC 753 that lies 1.4 Mly (0.44 Mpc) away.

== Supermassive black hole ==
NGC 753 has a supermassive black hole with an estimated mass of (2.2 ± 0.4) × 10^{7} M☉.

== Supernovae ==
NGC 753 has hosted two supernovae:

- SN 1954E (type unknown, mag. 18.5) was discovered by Fritz Zwicky on 26 September 1954.
- SN 2025mbr (Type Ia, mag. 17.3695) was discovered by the Automatic Learning for the Rapid Classification of Events (ALeRCE) on 25 May 2025.

== See also ==
- List of NGC objects (1–1000)
