= NGC 679 =

Galaxy in the constellation Andromeda

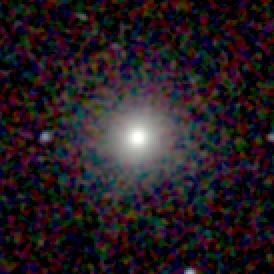
- 2MASS image of NGC 679.

Observation data (J2000 epoch)
- Constellation: Andromeda
- Right ascension: 01^{h} 49^{m} 43.8^{s}
- Declination: 35° 47′ 08″
- Redshift: 0.016842
- Heliocentric radial velocity: 5049 km/s
- Distance: 213 Mly (65.4 Mpc)
- Group or cluster: Abell 262
- Apparent magnitude (V): 13.33

Characteristics
- Type: E, S0^-
- Size: ~106,000 ly (32.4 kpc) (estimated)
- Apparent size (V): 2.1 x 2.1

Other designations
- CGCG 522-15, MCG 6-5-12, PGC 6711, UGC 1283

NGC 679 is an elliptical or a lenticular galaxy located 210 million light-years away in the constellation Andromeda. The galaxy was discovered by astronomer William Herschel on September 13, 1784 and is a member of Abell 262.

It is also a radio galaxy.

== Dust Disk ==
NGC 679 hosts a nearly face-on disk of dust with a diameter of ~9,800 ly (3 kpc).

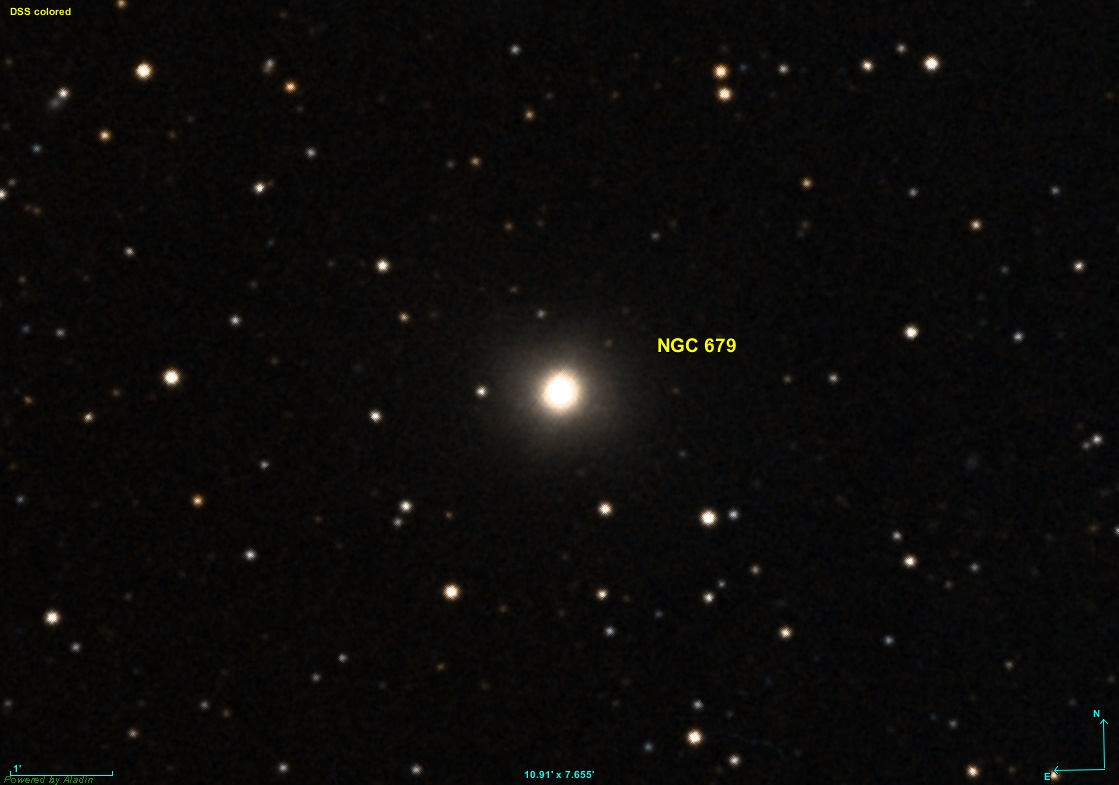
NGC 679 (DSS)

== See also ==
- List of NGC objects (1–1000)
