= NGC 700 =

Galaxy in constellation Andromeda

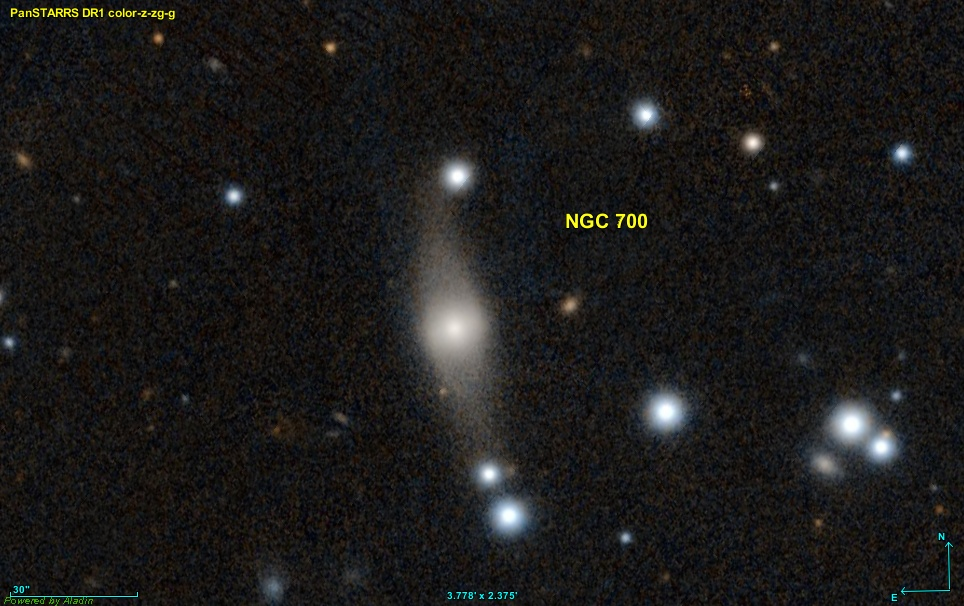
- 2MASS image of NGC 700.

Observation data (J2000 epoch)
- Constellation: Andromeda
- Right ascension: 01^{h} 52^{m} 16.8^{s}
- Declination: 36° 02′ 12″
- Redshift: 0.015264
- Heliocentric radial velocity: 4576 km/s
- Distance: 200 Mly (60 Mpc)
- Group or cluster: Abell 262
- Apparent magnitude (V): 15.16

Characteristics
- Type: S0?
- Size: ~55,000 ly (17 kpc) (estimated)
- Apparent size (V): 0.9 x 0.7

Other designations
- CGCG 522-30, PGC 6928

NGC 700 is a lenticular galaxy located 200 million light-years away in the constellation Andromeda. NGC 700 was discovered by astronomer Bindon Stoney on October 28, 1850. It is also a member of Abell 262.

The galaxy PGC 6924 is often misidentified as NGC 700.

== See also ==
- List of NGC objects (1–1000)
