= NGC 732 =

Galaxy in constellation Andromeda

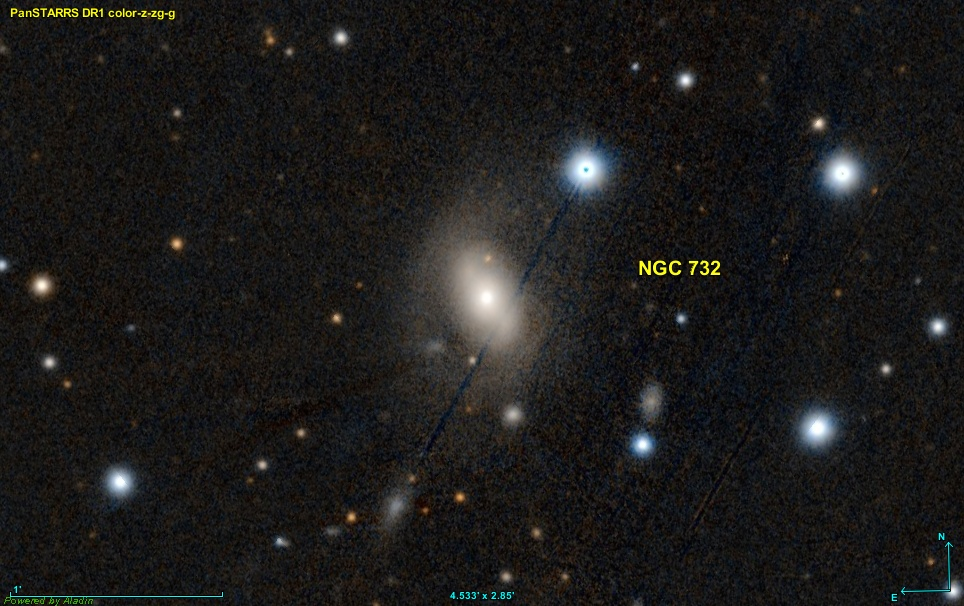
- Pan-STARRS image of NGC 732

Observation data (J2000 epoch)
- Constellation: Andromeda
- Right ascension: 01^{h} 56^{m} 27.7^{s}
- Declination: 36° 48′ 08″
- Redshift: 0.019660
- Heliocentric radial velocity: 5894 km/s
- Distance: 250 Mly (77 Mpc)
- Group or cluster: Abell 262
- Apparent magnitude (V): 14.49

Characteristics
- Type: S0
- Size: ~120,000 ly (37 kpc) (estimated)
- Apparent size (V): 1.4 x 1.0

Other designations
- Mrk 1011, MCG +06-05-057, PGC 007270, UGC 01406

NGC 732 is a lenticular galaxy located 250 million light-years away in the constellation Andromeda. It was discovered by astronomer Édouard Stephan on December 5, 1883 and is a member of Abell 262.

== Supernova ==
One supernova has been observed in NGC 732:

- 2017fpt (Type Ia, mag. 18.88) was discovered by Gaia Photometric Science Alerts on July 20, 2017.

== See also ==
- List of NGC objects (1–1000)
