= NGC 709 =

Galaxy in the constellation Andromeda

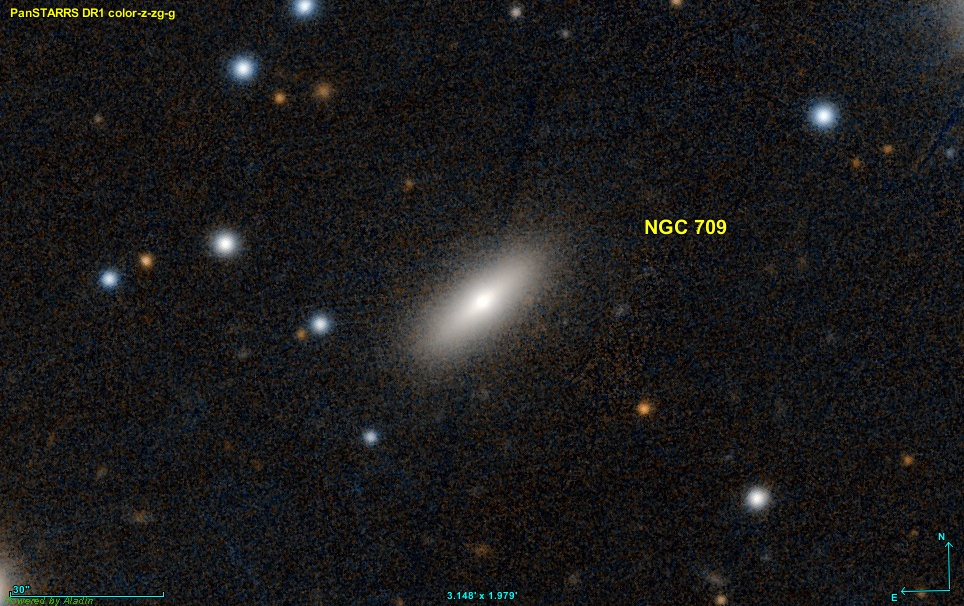
- Pan-STARRS image of NGC 709

Observation data (J2000 epoch)
- Constellation: Andromeda
- Right ascension: 01^{h} 52^{m} 50.6^{s}
- Declination: 36° 13′ 24″
- Redshift: 0.011928
- Heliocentric radial velocity: 3576 km/s
- Distance: 150 Mly (45 Mpc)
- Group or cluster: Abell 262
- Apparent magnitude (V): 15.23

Characteristics
- Type: S0
- Size: ~46,000 ly (14 kpc) (estimated)
- Apparent size (V): 0.6 x 0.3

Other designations
- PGC 006969

NGC 709 is a lenticular galaxy located 150 million light-years away in the constellation Andromeda. It was discovered by the Irish engineer and astronomer Bindon Blood Stoney on October 28, 1850 and is a member of the galaxy cluster Abell 262.

== See also ==
- List of NGC objects (1–1000)
