= NGC 688 =

Galaxy in the constellation Triangulum

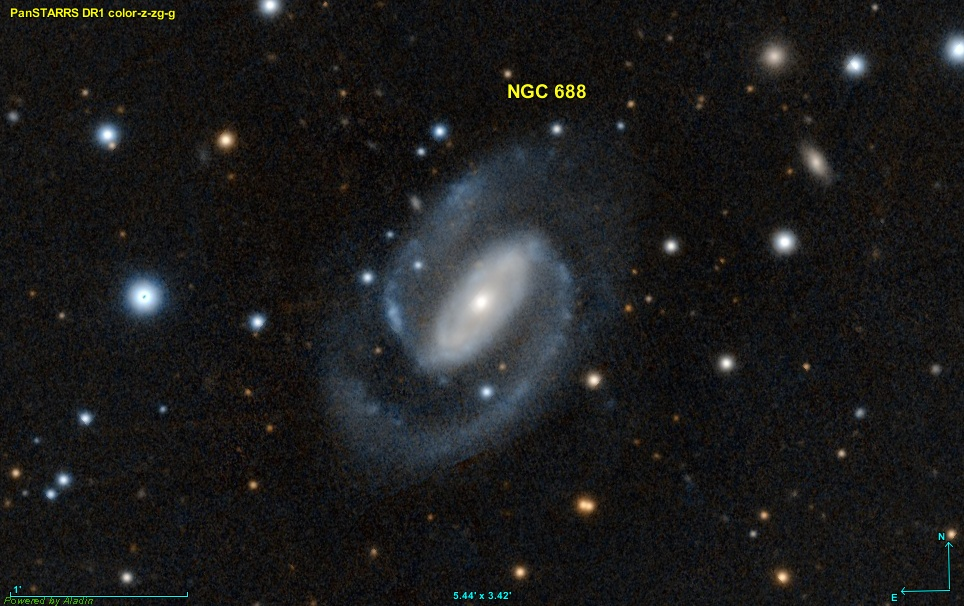
- Pan-STARRS image of NGC 688

Observation data (J2000 epoch)
- Constellation: Triangulum
- Right ascension: 01^{h} 50^{m} 44.2^{s}
- Declination: 35° 17′ 04″
- Redshift: 0.013846
- Heliocentric radial velocity: 4151 km/s
- Distance: 193 Mly (59.2 Mpc)
- Group or cluster: Abell 262
- Apparent magnitude (V): 13.35

Characteristics
- Type: SBb (R')SAB(rs)b
- Size: ~150,000 ly (45 kpc) (estimated)
- Apparent size (V): 2.5 x 1.5

Other designations
- CGCG 522-20, IRAS 01478+3502, KUG 0147+350, MCG 6-5-15, Mrk 1009, PGC 6799, UGC 1302

NGC 688 is a barred spiral galaxy with starburst activity located 190 million light-years away in the constellation Triangulum. It was discovered by astronomer Heinrich d'Arrest on September 16, 1865 and is a member of the galaxy cluster Abell 262.

== See also ==
- List of NGC objects (1–1000)
