= NGC 704 =

Galaxy in the constellation Andromeda

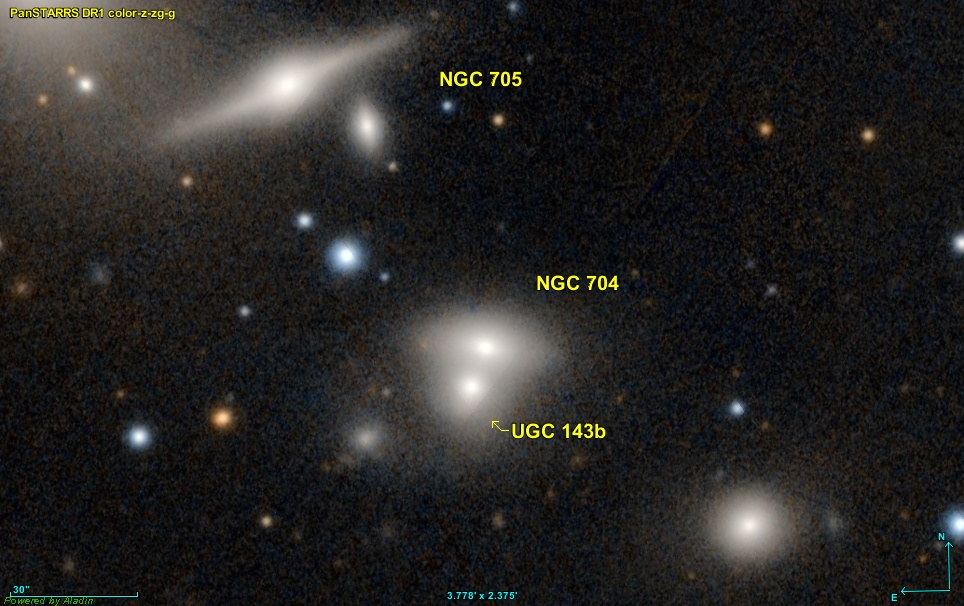
- Pan-STARRS image of NGC 704

Observation data (J2000 epoch)
- Constellation: Andromeda
- Right ascension: 01^{h} 52^{m} 37.8^{s}
- Declination: 36° 07′ 32″
- Redshift: 0.015778
- Heliocentric radial velocity: 4730 km/s
- Distance: 220 Mly (67 Mpc)
- Group or cluster: Abell 262
- Apparent magnitude (V): 14.1

Characteristics
- Type: E/S0
- Size: ~39,000 ly (12 kpc) (estimated)
- Apparent size (V): 0.1 x 0.6

Other designations
- UGC 01343, PGC 006953, MCG +06-05-028

NGC 704 is a lenticular galaxy located 220 million light-years away in the constellation Andromeda. The galaxy was discovered by astronomer William Herschel on September 21, 1786 and is also a member of Abell 262.

== See also ==
- List of NGC objects (1–1000)
