= NGC 668 =

Galaxy in constellation Andromeda

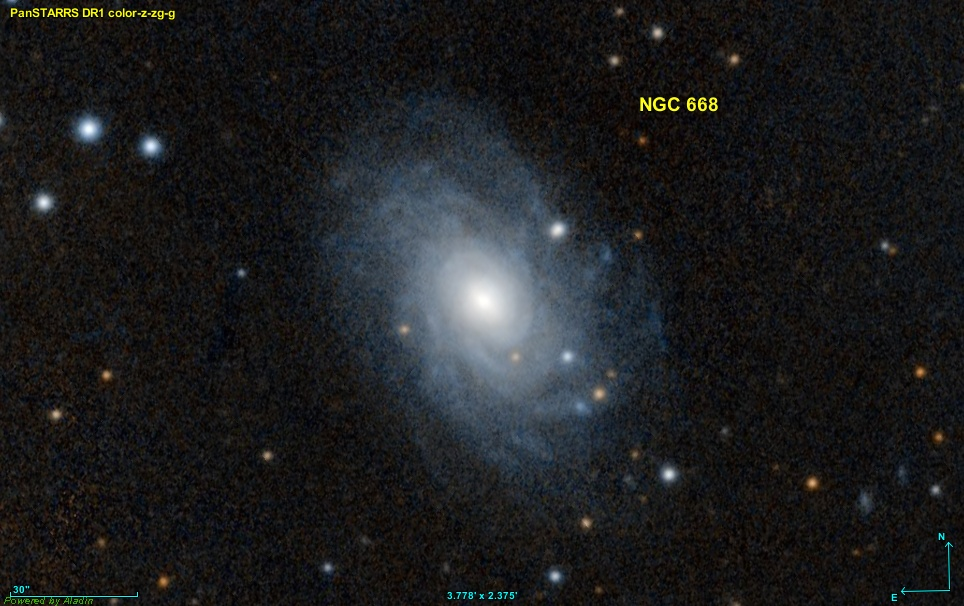
- Pan-STARRS image of NGC 668

Observation data (J2000 epoch)
- Constellation: Andromeda
- Right ascension: 01^{h} 46^{m} 22.7^{s}
- Declination: 36° 27′ 37″
- Redshift: 0.015004
- Heliocentric radial velocity: 4498 km/s
- Distance: 200 Mly (60 Mpc)
- Group or cluster: Abell 262
- Apparent magnitude (V): 13.74

Characteristics
- Type: Sb
- Size: ~76,000 ly (23.4 kpc) (estimated)
- Apparent size (V): 1.8 x 1.2

Other designations
- UGC 1238, MCG +06-05-003, PGC 6502

NGC 668 is a spiral galaxy located 200 million light-years away in the constellation Andromeda. It was discovered by astronomer Édouard Stephan on December 4, 1880 and is a member of Abell 262.

== See also ==
- List of NGC objects (1–1000)
