= NGC 687 =

Galaxy in constellation Andromeda

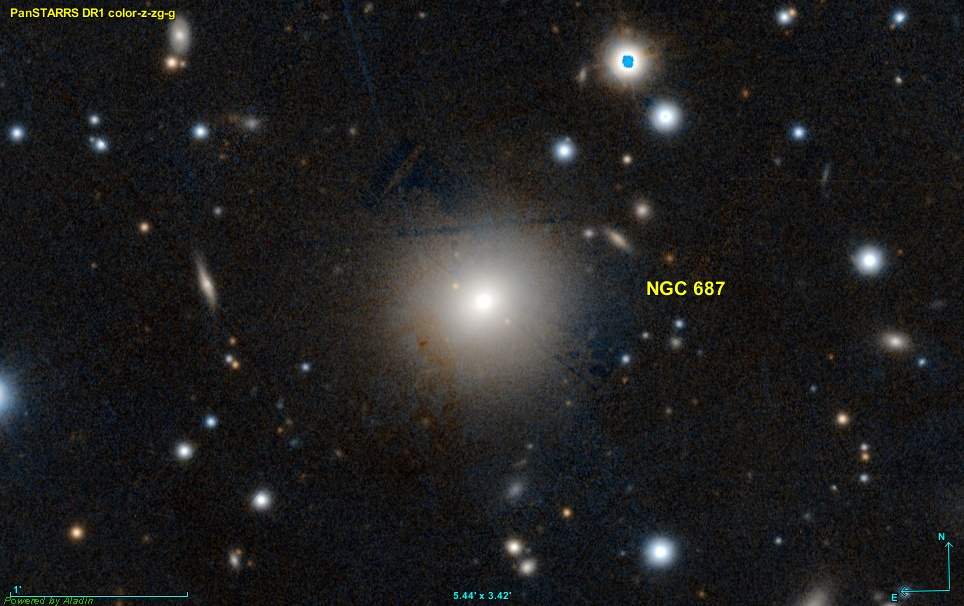
- Pan-STARRS image of NGC 687

Observation data (J2000 epoch)
- Constellation: Andromeda
- Right ascension: 01^{h} 50^{m} 33.2^{s}
- Declination: 36° 22′ 15″
- Redshift: 0.016982
- Heliocentric radial velocity: 5091 km/s
- Distance: 220 Mly (66 Mpc)
- Group or cluster: Abell 262
- Apparent magnitude (V): 13.30

Characteristics
- Type: S0
- Size: ~110,000 ly (33.6 kpc) (estimated)
- Apparent size (V): 1.4 x 1.4

Other designations
- CGCG 522-17, MCG 6-5-14, PGC 6782, UGC 1298

NGC 687 is a lenticular galaxy located 220 million light-years away in the constellation Andromeda. It was discovered by astronomer William Herschel on September 21, 1786 and is a member of Abell 262.

== See also ==
- List of NGC objects (1–1000)
