= NGC 710 =

Galaxy in the constellation Andromeda

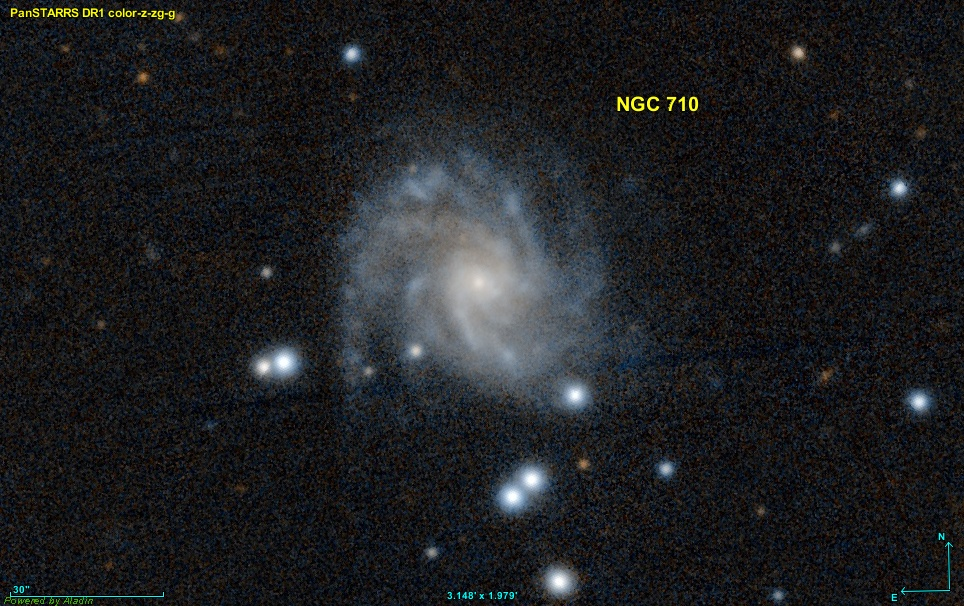
- NGC 710 imaged by Pan-STARRS

Observation data (J2000 epoch)
- Constellation: Andromeda
- Right ascension: 01^{h} 52^{m} 53.9666^{s}
- Declination: +36° 03′ 10.162″
- Redshift: 0.020431
- Heliocentric radial velocity: 6125 ± 7 km/s
- Distance: 282.5 ± 19.8 Mly (86.60 ± 6.07 Mpc)
- Group or cluster: Abell 262
- Apparent magnitude (V): 14.27

Characteristics
- Type: Scd
- Size: ~57,600 ly (17.65 kpc) (estimated)
- Apparent size (V): 1.3′ × 1.2′

Other designations
- IRAS 01499+3548, UGC 1349, MCG +06-05-033, PGC 6972, CGCG 522-041

NGC 710 is a spiral galaxy located 260 million light-years away in the constellation Andromeda. It was discovered by the Irish engineer and astronomer Bindon Blood Stoney on October 28, 1850 and is a member of the galaxy cluster Abell 262.

It is also a radio galaxy.

== Supernovae ==
Two supernovae have been observed in NGC 710:

- SN 2002eo (Type II, mag. 18) was discovered by LOTOSS (Lick Observatory and Tenagra Observatory Supernova Searches) on August 20, 2002.
- SN 2025zmx (Type Ic, mag. 19.972) was discovered by I. Pérez-Fournon et al. on 3 October 2025.

== See also ==
- List of NGC objects (1–1000)
