= NGC 712 =

Galaxy in constellation Andromeda

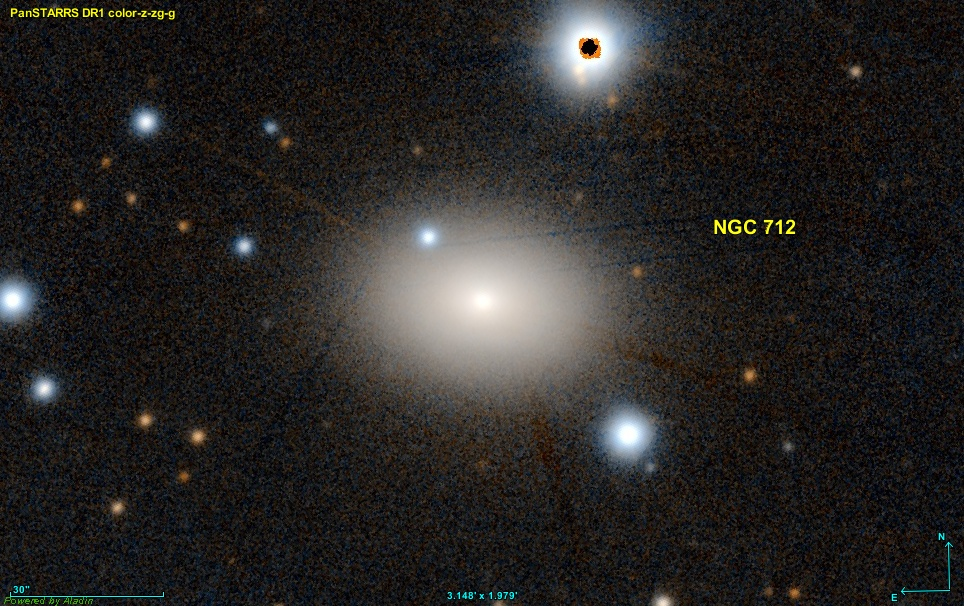
- Pan-STARRS image of NGC 712

Observation data (J2000 epoch)
- Constellation: Andromeda
- Right ascension: 01^{h} 53^{m} 08.4^{s}
- Declination: 36° 49′ 11″
- Redshift: 0.017779
- Heliocentric radial velocity: 5330 km/s
- Distance: 230 Mly (69 Mpc)
- Group or cluster: Abell 262
- Apparent magnitude (V): 13.77

Characteristics
- Type: S0
- Size: ~100,000 ly (32 kpc) (estimated)
- Apparent size (V): 1.3 x 1.0

Other designations
- MCG 6-5-35, PGC 6988, UGC 1352

NGC 712 is a lenticular galaxy located 230 million light-years away in the constellation Andromeda. It was discovered by astronomer John Herschel in October 1828 and is a member of Abell 262.

== See also ==
- List of NGC objects (1–1000)
