= NGC 705 =

Galaxy in the constellation Andromeda

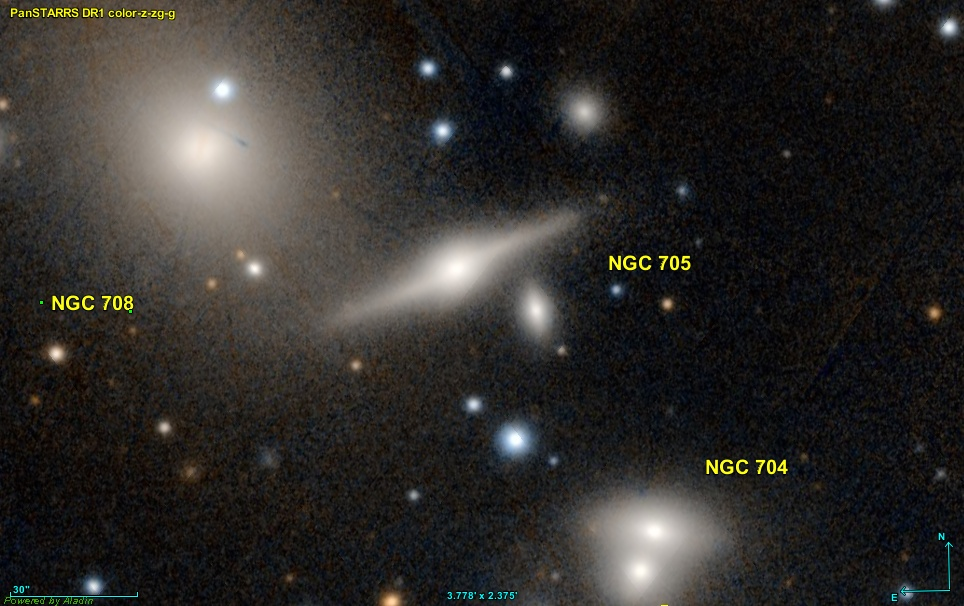
- Pan-STARRS image of NGC 705

Observation data (J2000 epoch)
- Constellation: Andromeda
- Right ascension: 01^{h} 52^{m} 41.5^{s}
- Declination: 36° 08′ 38″
- Redshift: 0.015057
- Heliocentric radial velocity: 4514 km/s
- Distance: 190 Mly (58.2 Mpc)
- Group or cluster: Abell 262
- Apparent magnitude (V): 14.63

Characteristics
- Type: S0/a
- Size: ~69,000 ly (21.2 kpc) (estimated)
- Apparent size (V): 1.2 x 0.3

Other designations
- 6ZW 90, CGCG 522-36, MCG 6-5-30, PGC 6958, UGC 1345

NGC 705 is a lenticular galaxy located 240 million light-years away in the constellation Andromeda. The galaxy was discovered by astronomer William Herschel on September 21, 1786 and is also a member of Abell 262.

Although NGC 705 is an early type galaxy, it has a dust lane that is concentrated toward its central region. It is projected to lie about 0.098 Mly (0.03 Mpc) from the cd-galaxy NGC 708.

== See also ==
- List of NGC objects (1–1000)
