= NGC 759 =

Galaxy in the constellation Andromeda

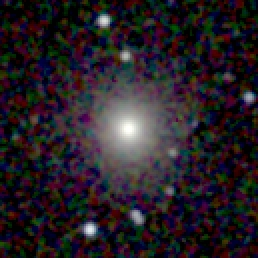
- 2MASS image of NGC 759.

Observation data (J2000 epoch)
- Constellation: Andromeda
- Right ascension: 01^{h} 57^{m} 50.3^{s}
- Declination: 36° 20′ 35″
- Redshift: 0.015567
- Heliocentric radial velocity: 4667 km/s
- Distance: 230 Mly (70.4 Mpc)
- Group or cluster: Abell 262
- Apparent magnitude (V): 13.3

Characteristics
- Type: E
- Size: ~110,000 ly (33 kpc) (estimated)
- Apparent size (V): 1.6 × 1.4

Other designations
- MCG 6-5-67, PGC 7397, UGC 1440

NGC 759 is an elliptical galaxy located 230 million light-years away in the constellation Andromeda. NGC 759 was discovered by astronomer by Heinrich d'Arrest on September 17, 1865. It is a member of Abell 262.

Despite being classified as a radio galaxy, the radio emission in NGC 759 could be due to star formation rather than an active galactic nucleus.

== Dust disk ==
The central region of NGC 759 harbors a face-on dust disk with tightly wound spiral structure. The disk has a diameter of 11,000 ly (3.4 kpc). The dust disk also contains a smaller circumnuclear molecular gas ring that has star formation in H II regions. These features may be the result of a merger of gas-rich disk galaxies or by the accretion of gas-rich material. In either scenario, the gas would have lost momentum and fallen to the center of the galaxy to produce the disk and current star formation. However, Vlasyuk et al. suggests that the disk and the smaller circumnuclear molecular gas ring with star formation inside the main disk formed from a tidal encounter between NGC 759 and a large spiral galaxy which was accompanied by a substantial gas accretion.

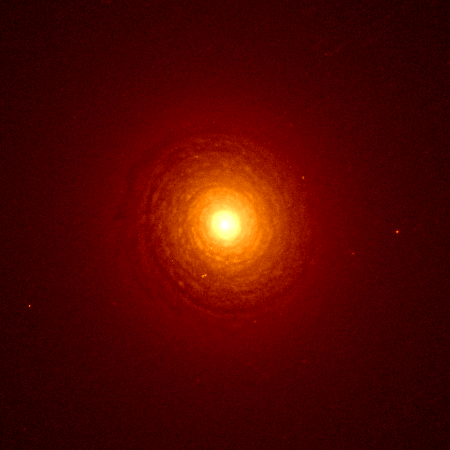
The dust disk in NGC 759 as imaged by the Hubble Space Telescope

== Molecular gas ==
NGC 759 contains 2.4 billion M☉ of molecular gas. Most of the gas is concentrated in a circumnuclear molecular gas ring with a diameter of 4,200 ly (1.3 kpc). The gas may be the result of the same merger event that produced the circumnuclear molecular gas ring and the main disk.

== Supernova ==
One supernova has been observed in NGC 759.

- SN 2002fb (Type Ia, mag. 17.1) was discovered by LOTOSS (Lick Observatory and Tenagra Observatory Supernova Searches) on September 6, 2002.

== See also ==
- List of NGC objects (1–1000)
