= NGC 714 =

Galaxy in constellation Andromeda

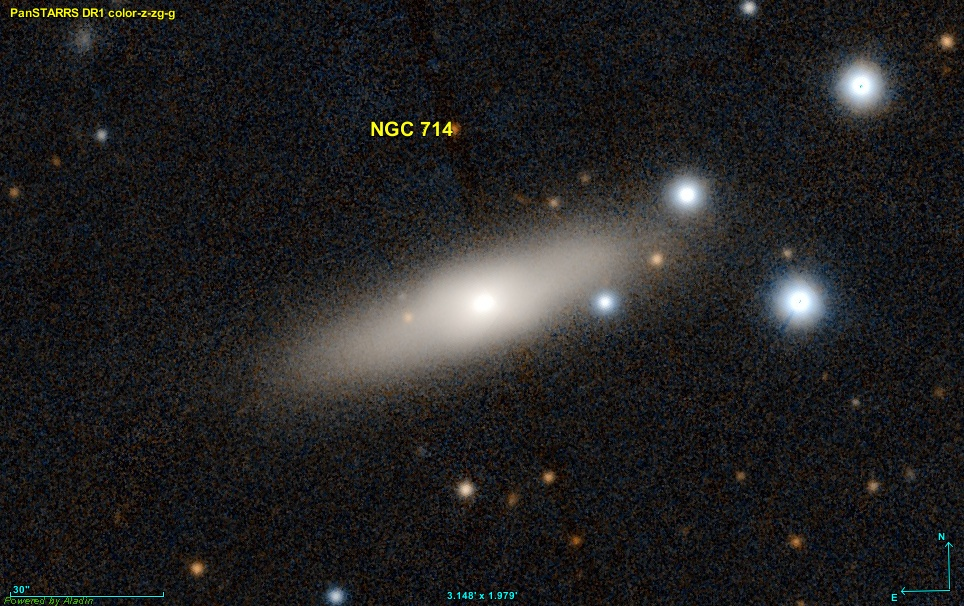
- Pan-STARRS image of NGC 714

Observation data (J2000 epoch)
- Constellation: Andromeda
- Right ascension: 01^{h} 53^{m} 29.6^{s}
- Declination: 36° 13′ 17″
- Redshift: 0.014737
- Heliocentric radial velocity: 4418 km/s
- Distance: 190 Mly (57 Mpc)
- Group or cluster: Abell 262
- Apparent magnitude (V): 14.10

Characteristics
- Type: S0/a
- Size: ~110,000 ly (33 kpc) (estimated)
- Apparent size (V): 1.5 x 0.4

Other designations
- MCG 6-5-37, PGC 7009, UGC 1358

NGC 714 is a lenticular galaxy located 190 million light-years away in the constellation Andromeda. The galaxy was discovered by astronomer Bindon Blood Stoney on October 28, 1850 and is a member of Abell 262.

== See also ==
- List of NGC objects (1–1000)
