= NGC 669 =

Galaxy in the constellation Triangulum

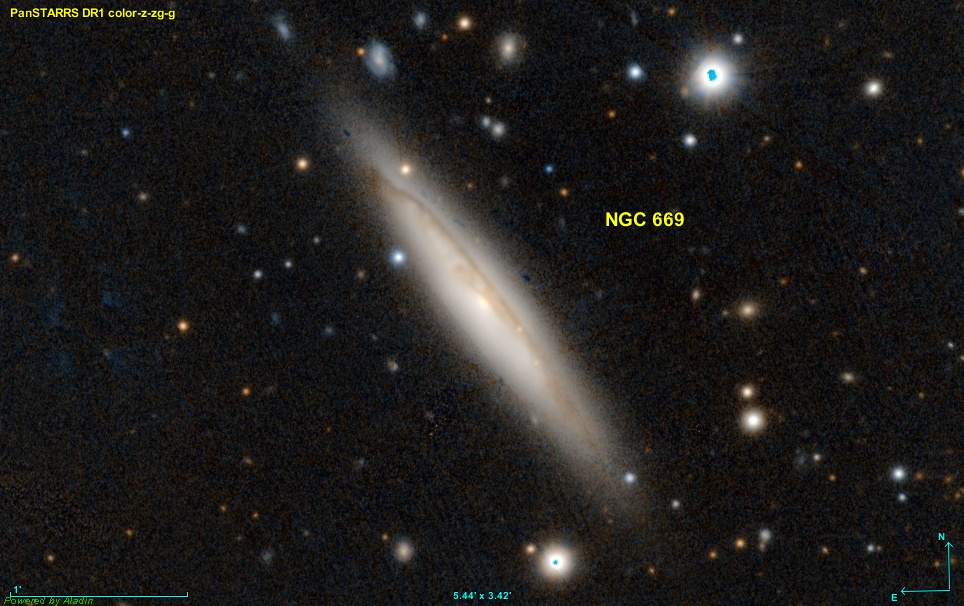
- Pan-STARRS image of NGC 669

Observation data (J2000 epoch)
- Constellation: Triangulum
- Right ascension: 01^{h} 47^{m} 16.1^{s}
- Declination: 35° 33′ 48″
- Redshift: 0.015591
- Heliocentric radial velocity: 4674 km/s
- Distance: 200 Mly (60 Mpc)
- Group or cluster: Abell 262
- Apparent magnitude (V): 13.36

Characteristics
- Type: Sab
- Size: ~245,000 ly (75.2 kpc) (estimated)
- Apparent size (V): 3.2 x 0.6

Other designations
- IRAS 01443+3519, UGC 1248, MCG 6-5-4, PGC 6560, CGCG 522-4

NGC 669 is an edge-on spiral galaxy with an active galactic nucleus located 200 million light-years away in the constellation Triangulum. NGC 669 was discovered by astronomer Édouard Stephan on November 28, 1883 and is a member of Abell 262.

== See also ==
- List of NGC objects (1–1000)
