= NGC 708 =

Galaxy in the constellation Andromeda

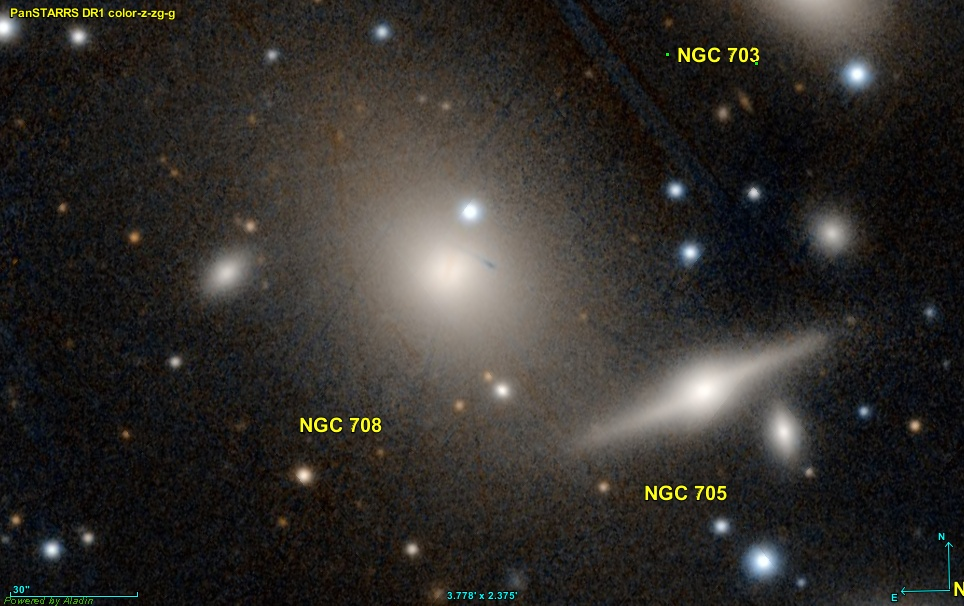
- NGC 708 imaged by Pan-STARRS

Observation data (J2000 epoch)
- Constellation: Andromeda
- Right ascension: 01^{h} 52^{m} 46.4467^{s}
- Declination: +36° 09′ 06.581″
- Redshift: 0.015886
- Heliocentric radial velocity: 4762 km/s
- Distance: 232.05 ± 16.32 Mly (71.147 ± 5.005 Mpc)
- Group or cluster: Abell 262
- Apparent magnitude (V): 13.70

Characteristics
- Type: E
- Size: ~200,000 ly (62 kpc) (estimated)
- Apparent size (V): 3.0′ × 2.5′

Other designations
- B2 0149+35, HOLM 049A, UGC 1348, MCG +06-05-031, PGC 6962, CGCG 522-039

NGC 708 is an elliptical galaxy located 240 million light-years away in the constellation Andromeda. It was discovered by German-British astronomer William Herschel on September 21, 1786. It is classified as a cD galaxy and is the brightest member of Abell 262. NGC 708 is a weak FR I radio galaxy and is also classified as a type 2 Seyfert galaxy.

NGC 708 is surrounded by 4,700 globular clusters.

== Dust lane ==
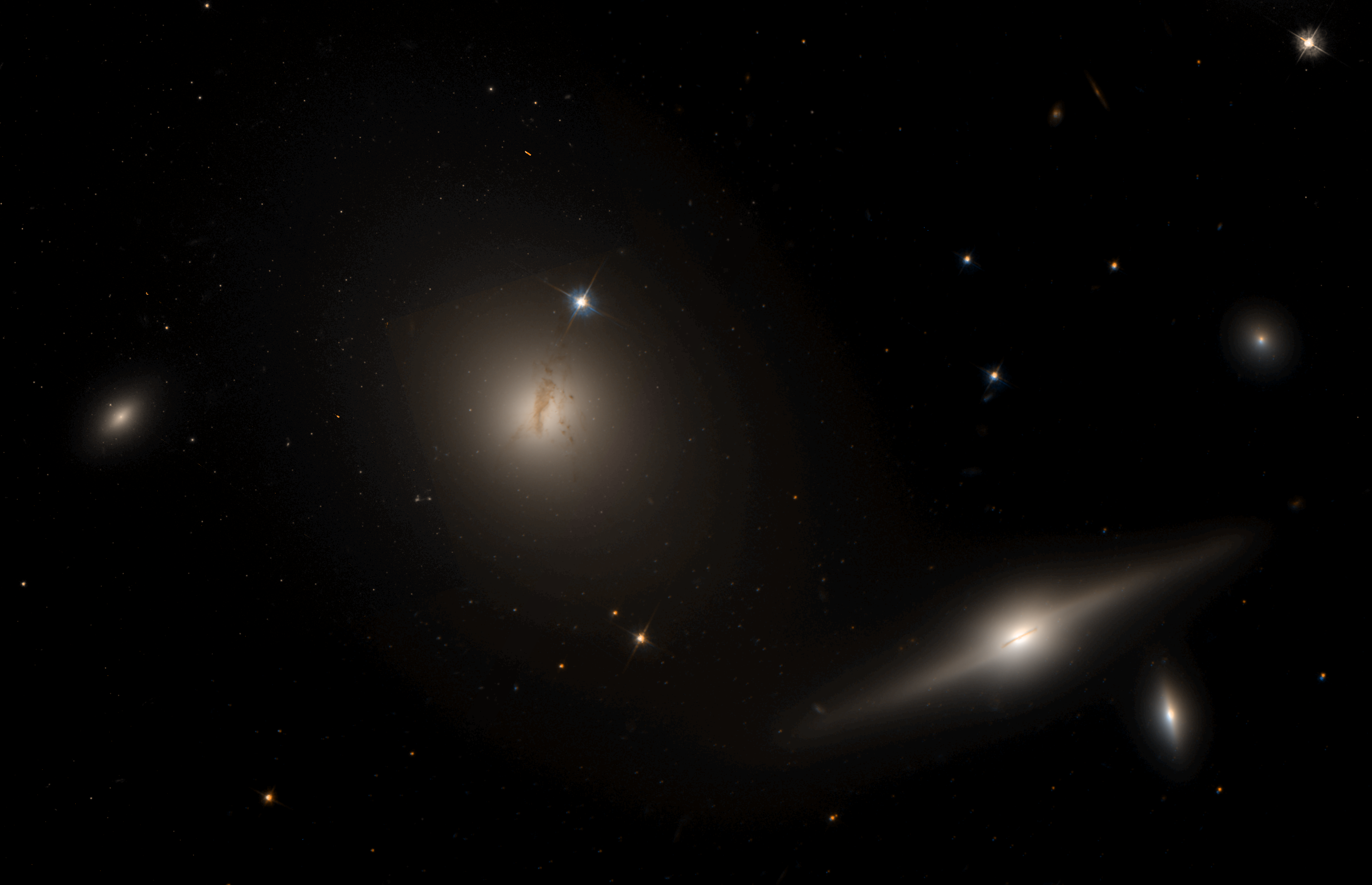
The dust lane in NGC 708 as imaged by the Hubble Space Telescope. NGC 705 can be seen at the lower right of the image.

Discovered in 1979 by Kotanyi et al., NGC 708 has a thin dust lane with an irregular structure. Besides the dust lane, there are also patches of dust that cross the nucleus. These features are oriented nearly perpendicular to the radio emission of the galaxy. The lane appears to be a nearly edge-on dust disk with a length of 16,000 ly (5 kpc).

The dust lane appears to have formed from a cooling accretion flow of intracluster medium (ICM) onto NGC 708.

== Supermassive black hole ==
NGC 708 has a supermassive black hole with an estimated mass of (2.9×10^{8} M☉) (10^{8.46}) M_{☉}.

The supermassive black hole is powering the radio jets and lobes in the galaxy.

== Radio morphology ==
NGC 708 contains two radio jets that are mildly bent and extend into ''s'' shaped double radio lobes with a total length of 200,000 ly (60 kpc).

Chandra observations have shown that the lobes have created a cavity in the intracluster medium of Abell 262.

== Possible interaction ==
NGC 708 may be interacting with NGC 705 which lies about 67,000 ly (20.6 kpc) to the south-west.

== See also ==
- List of NGC objects (1–1000)
- Messier 87
- NGC 1275
