= NGC 6560 =

Spiral galaxy in the constellation Hercules

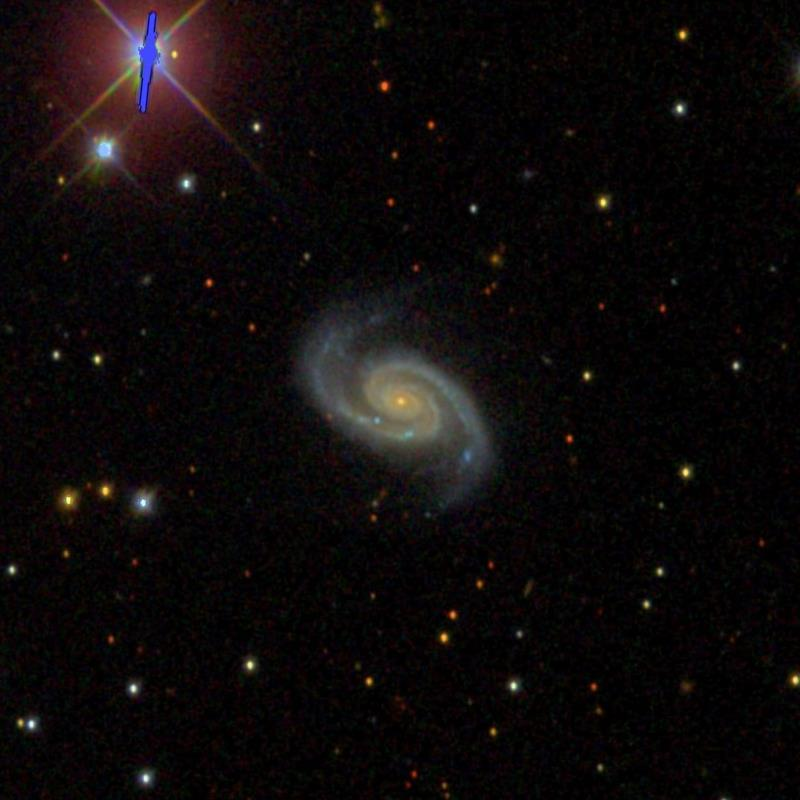
- SDSS image of NGC 6560

Observation data (J2000 epoch)
- Constellation: Hercules
- Right ascension: 18^{h} 05^{m} 13.982^{s}
- Declination: +46° 52′ 53.53″
- Redshift: 0.023486
- Heliocentric radial velocity: 6958
- Distance: 303.87 ± 71.20 Mly (93.167 ± 21.831 Mpc)
- Apparent magnitude (V): 13.4
- Apparent magnitude (B): 14.2

Characteristics
- Type: S
- Size: 1.2' × 0.8'

Other designations
- NGC 6560, UGC 11117, MCG 8-33-19, ZWG 254.15, IRAS 18038+4652, PGC 61381

NGC 6560 is a spiral galaxy located in the constellation Hercules. It was discovered by Lewis A. Swift on 22 October 1886.

== Supernovae ==
Three supernovae have been observed in NGC 6560:

- SN 2021brb (Type II, mag. 18.8747) was discovered by Automatic Learning for the Rapid Classification of Events (ALeRCE) on 3 February 2021.
- SN 2021qqn (Type Ia, mag. 18.5107) was discovered by ALeRCE on 21 June 2021.
- SN 2022oyp (Type II, mag. 19.6437) was discovered by ALeRCE on 17 July 2022.
