= Abell 262 =

Galaxy cluster in the constellation Andromeda

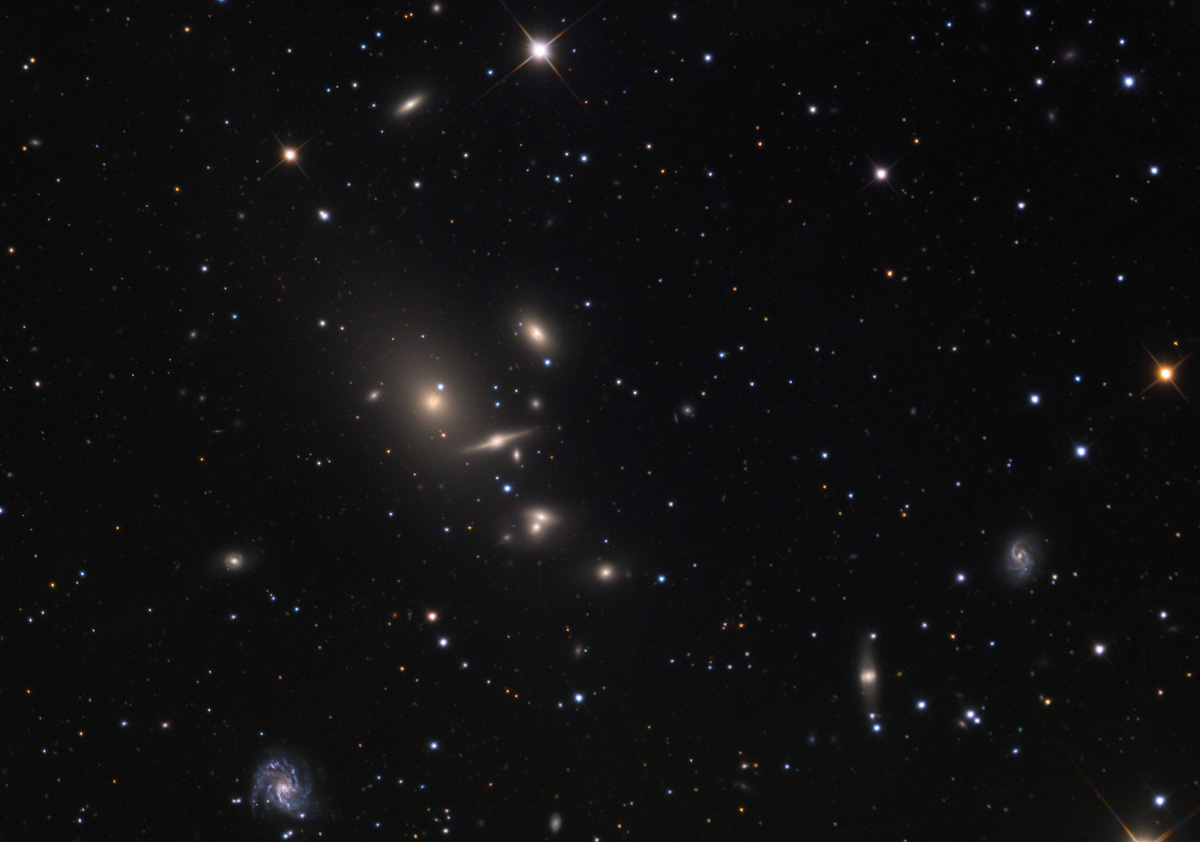

Observation data (Epoch J2000)
- Constellation(s): Between Andromeda and Triangulum
- Right ascension: 01^{h} 52^{m} 50.4^{s}
- Declination: +36° 08′ 46″
- Richness class: 0
- Bautz–Morgan classification: III
- Redshift: 0.01641 (4 920 km/s)
- Distance: 68.8 Mpc (224 Mly) h^{−1}_{0.678}
- ICM temperature: 2.08 keV
- X-ray flux: (48.6 ± 9.9%)×10^{−12} erg s^{−1} cm^{−2} (0.1–2.4 keV)

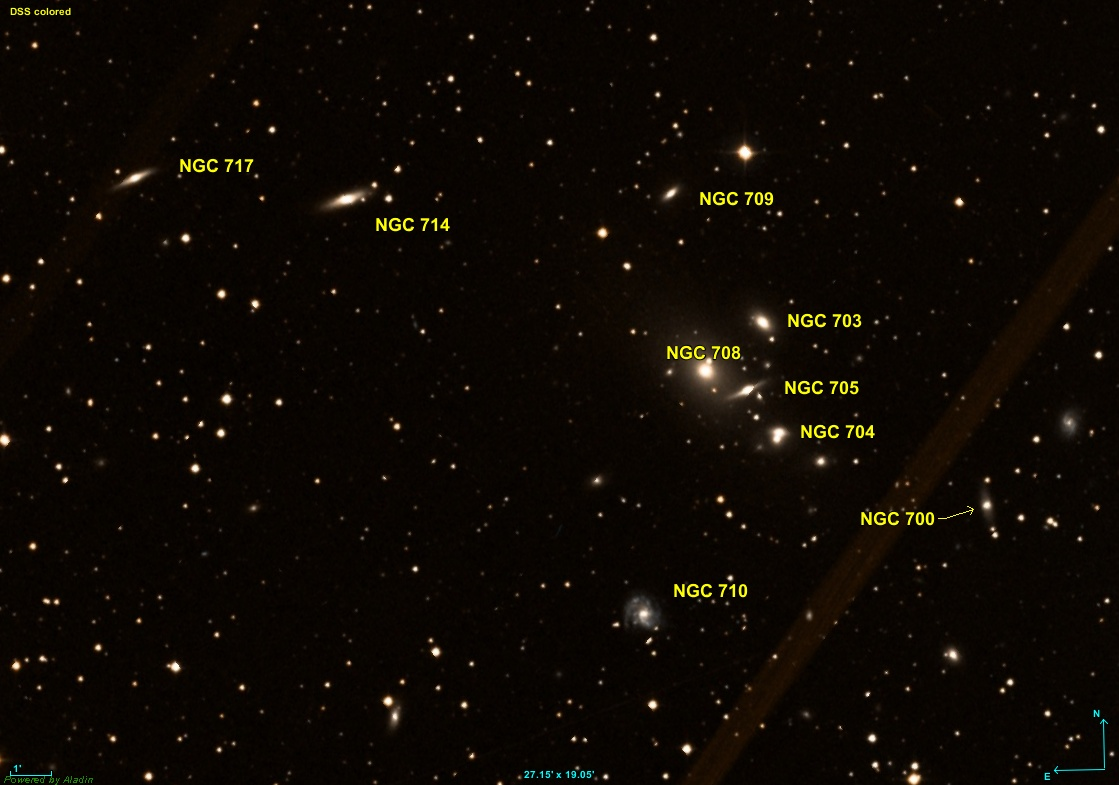
An image of Abell 262

Abell 262 is a galaxy cluster in the Abell catalogue. Although its central galaxy, NGC 708, is a giant cD galaxy, most of its bright galaxies are spirals, which is unusual for a galaxy cluster. With approximately 200 members it is a comparatively small cluster.

It is part of the Perseus–Pisces Supercluster, one of the largest known structures in the universe. Together with Abell 347 and Abell 426. It has at least 34–40 member galaxies.

== See also ==
- Abell catalogue
- List of Abell clusters
