= NGC 564 =

Elliptical Galaxy in the constellation Cetus

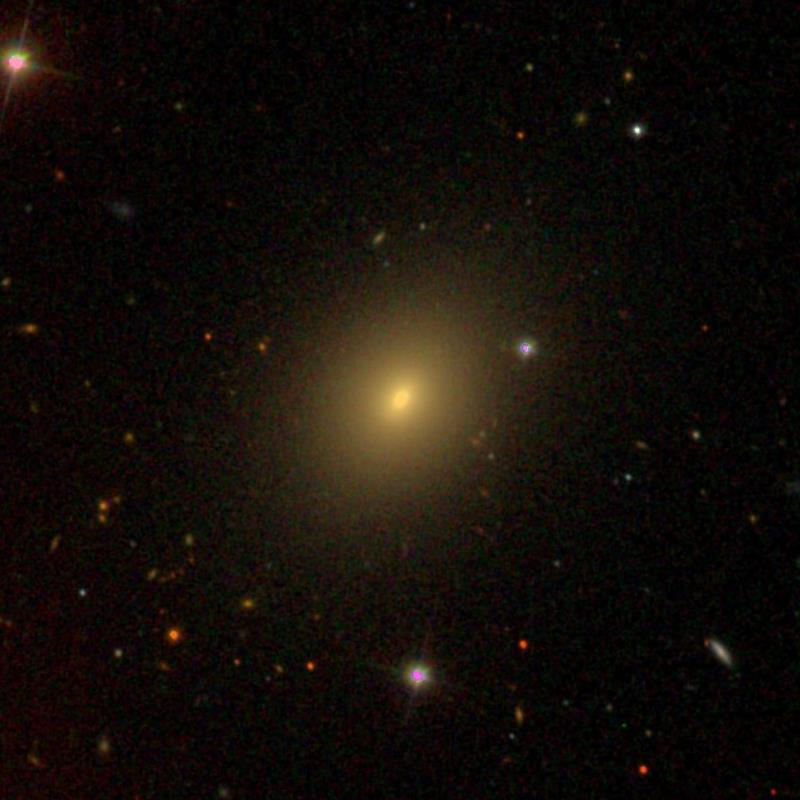
- NGC 564 image by SDSS

Observation data (J2000 epoch)
- Constellation: Cetus
- Right ascension: 01^{h} 27^{m} 48.2007^{s}
- Declination: −01° 52′ 46.006″
- Distance: 266 Mly

Characteristics
- Type: E

Other designations
- UGC 1044, MCG +00-04-154, CGCG 385-148, CGCG 0125.2-0208

NGC 564 is a large elliptical galaxy located in the constellation of Cetus. NGC 564 was discovered by the German-British astronomer William Herschel on October 1, 1785.

== NGC 545 and Abell 194 Group ==
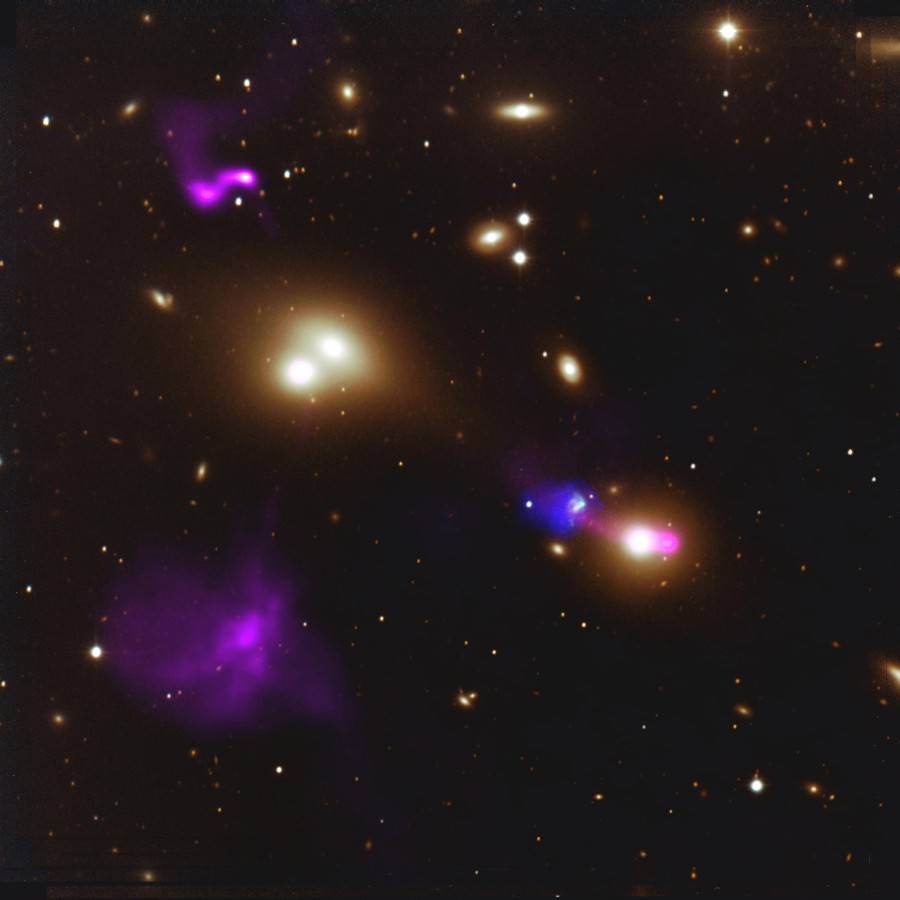
Abell 194 cluster

NGC 564 is part of the NGC 545 group, the largest and brightest galaxy in this group. The NGC 545 group is part of a larger group, the Abell 194 galaxy cluster. In fact, the designation DRCG 7-6 is used by Wolfgang Steinicke to indicate that this galaxy is included in Alan Dressler's catalog of galaxy clusters. The numbers 7 and 6 indicate that it is the 7th cluster (Abell 194) in the list and the 6th galaxy in the list, respectively. This same galaxy is also designated as ABELL 194:[D80] 6 by the NASA/IPAC database, which is equivalent. Dressler indicates that NGC 519 is an E-type elliptical galaxy.

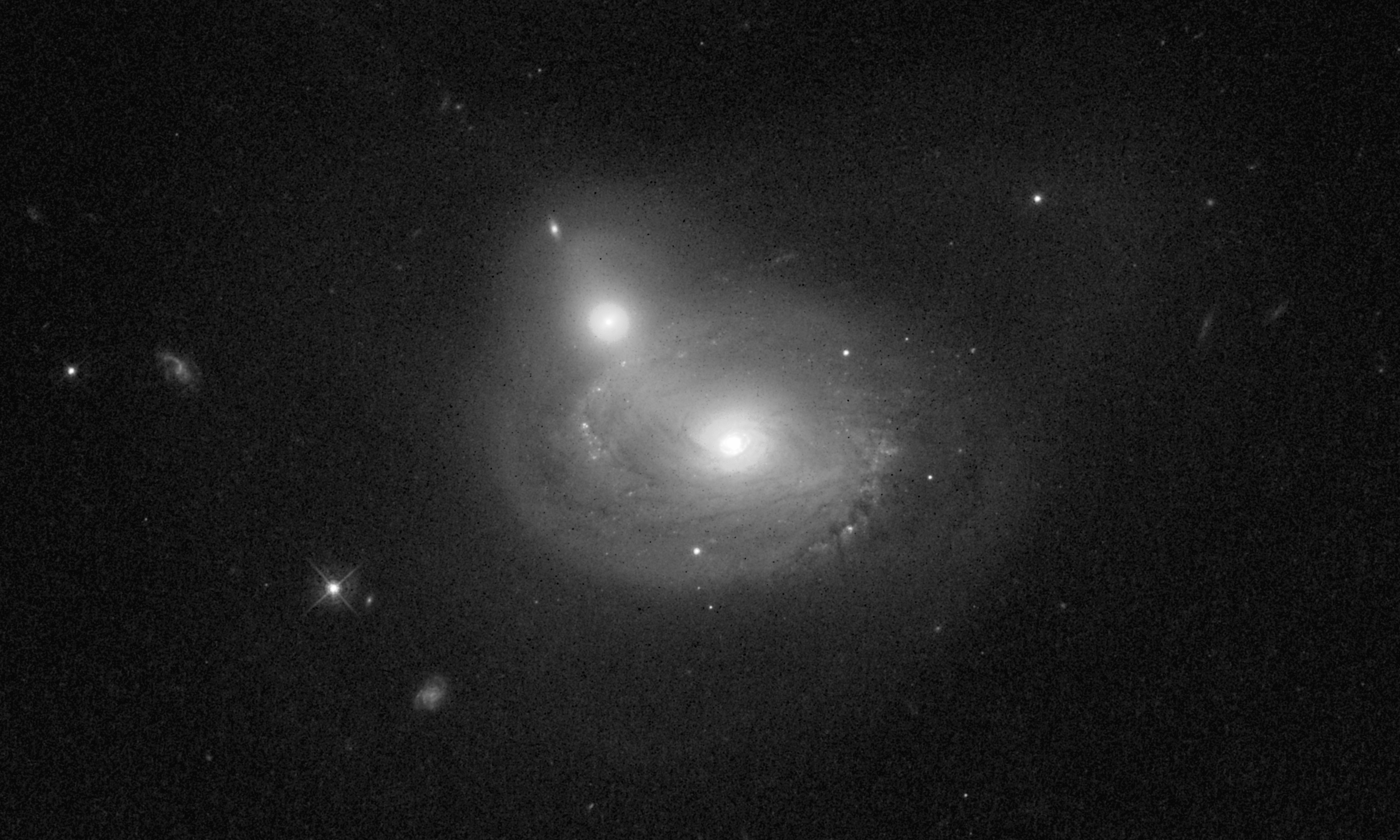
NGC 545 and NGC 547 by the Hubble Space Telescope

Two galaxies in this group, NGC 545 and NGC 547, produce immense and powerful jets of matter in the region surrounding their central supermassive black hole. These jets have been detected in radio waves by the VLA radio telescopes and are shown in purple in the cluster image below. The jets from these two gravitationally interacting galaxies are projected to distances of about 250,000 light-years. The shorter jet from galaxy NGC 541, slightly lower right, collides with a dark blue hydrogen cloud that has also been detected in radio waves by the VLA. The shock wave created by this jet has generated a star-forming region, colored pale blue, imaged in visible light by the 2.3-meter telescope at the Siding Spring Observatory in Australia . This rather rare type of star nursery is known as a Minkowski object, an example of a black hole creating life in the universe in the form of baby stars.

Besides NGC 564, the main galaxies in the NGC 545 group are NGC 545, NGC 530, NGC 541, NGC 547, NGC 560, NGC 570, NGC 577, NGC 585, UGC 892 and UGC 1062 (respectively CGCG 0118.7-0048 and CGCG 0126.4-0049 noted as 0118-0048 and 0126-0049 in an article by Abraham Mahtessian published in 1998).
