= NGC 519 =

Elliptical galaxy in the constellation Cetus

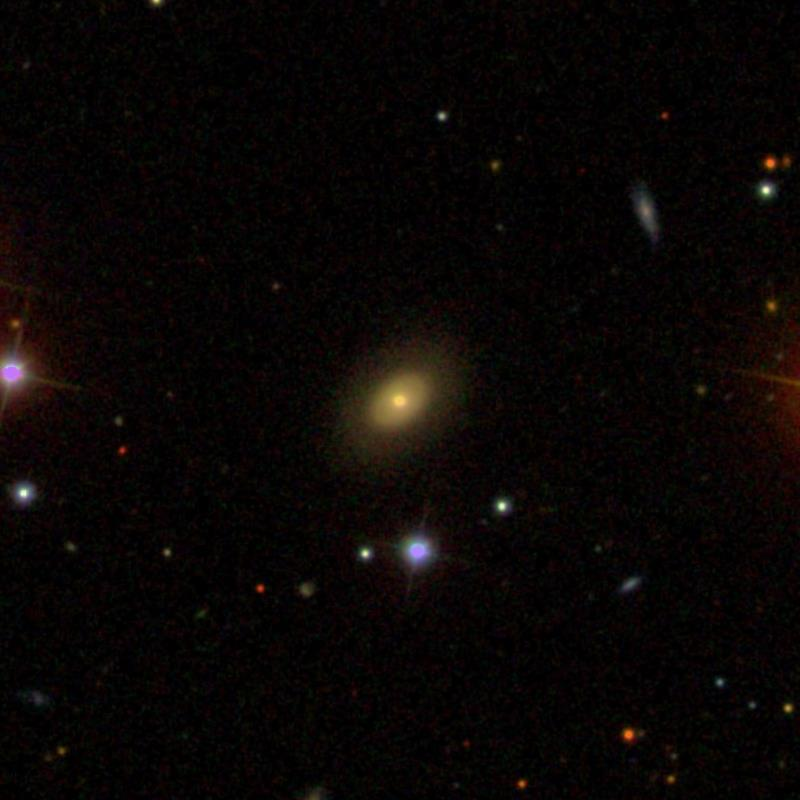
- NGC 519 imabed by SDSS

Observation data (J2000 epoch)
- Constellation: Cetus
- Right ascension: 01^{h} 24^{m} 28.6390^{s}
- Declination: −01° 38′ 28.526″
- Redshift: 0.017756 ± 0.000260
- Heliocentric radial velocity: (5276 ± 78) km/s
- Distance: 242 Mly
- Group or cluster: Abell 194
- Apparent magnitude (V): 14.4
- Apparent magnitude (B): 15.4

Characteristics
- Type: E
- Size: ~53,500 ly (16.39 kpc) (estimated)
- Apparent size (V): 0.5′ × 0.3′

Other designations
- 2MASS J01242863-0138284, MCG +00-04-116, PGC 5182, CGCG 385-103

NGC 519, also occasionally referred to as PGC 5182, is an elliptical galaxy located approximately 242 million light-years from the Solar System in the constellation Cetus. It was discovered by American astronomer Lewis Swift on 20 November 1886. It is a member of the Abell 194 galaxy cluster.

== Observation history ==
Swift discovered the object along with NGC 530, 538 and 557 using a 16-inch refractor telescope at the Warner Observatory. It was later catalogued by John Louis Emil Dreyer in the New General Catalogue, where the galaxy was described as "most extremely faint, very small, round, very difficult".

== Description ==
The galaxy appears very dim in the sky as it only has an apparent visual magnitude of 14.4. It can be classified as type E using the Hubble Sequence. The object's distance of roughly 240 million light-years from the Solar System can be estimated using its redshift and Hubble's law.

== See also ==
- List of NGC objects (1–1000)
