= NGC 535 =

Lenticular galaxy in the constellation Cetus

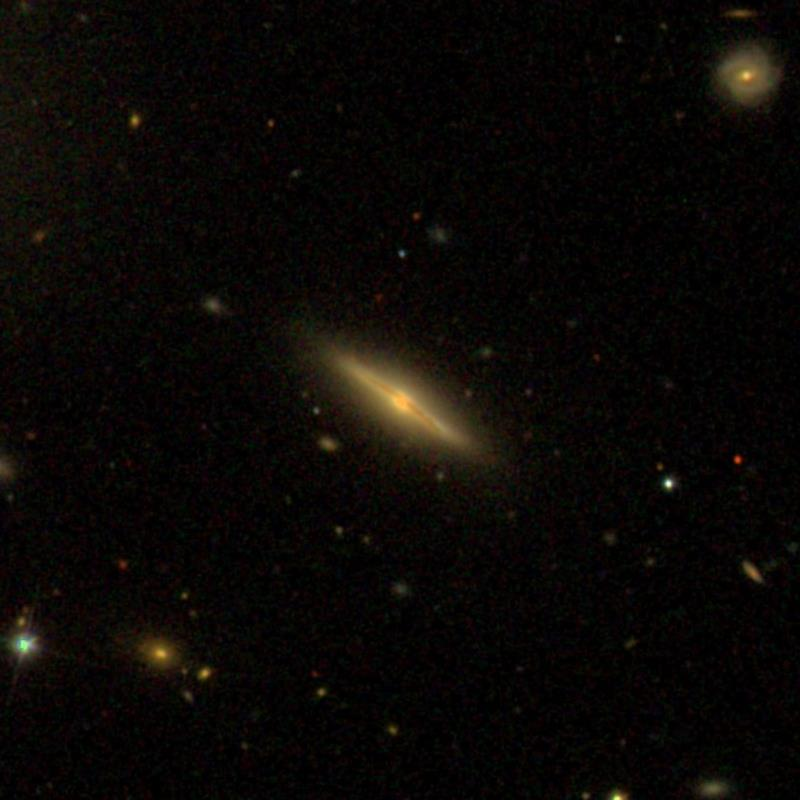
- NGC 535 (SDSS DR14)

Observation data (J2000 epoch)
- Constellation: Cetus
- Right ascension: 01^{h} 25^{m} 31.169^{s}
- Declination: −01° 24′ 29.20″
- Redshift: 0.016351
- Heliocentric radial velocity: 4862 km/s
- Distance: 230 Mly (69 Mpc)
- Group or cluster: Abell 194
- Apparent magnitude (B): 14.83

Characteristics
- Type: S0^{+}
- Size: ~95,000 ly (29.12 kpc) (estimated)
- Apparent size (V): 1.0′ × 0.3′

Other designations
- UGC 997, MCG +00-04-133, PGC 5282, CGCG 385-124

NGC 535 is a lenticular galaxy in the constellation Cetus. Its velocity with respect to the cosmic microwave background for is 4,600±27 km/s, which corresponds to a Hubble distance of 221.3 ± 15.6 Mly (67.84 ± 4.77 Mpc). It has an estimated diameter of 95,000 light years. NGC 535 was discovered by German astronomer Heinrich Ludwig d'Arrest on October 31, 1864. It is a member of the Abell 194 galaxy cluster.

== NGC 530 group ==
NGC 535 is a member the NGC 530 group (also known as LGG 22), which contains at least 3 galaxies, including NGC 530, NGC 558 and NGC 535.

== See also ==
- List of NGC objects (1–1000)
