= Minkowski's Object =

Dwarf irregular galaxy in the constellation Cetus

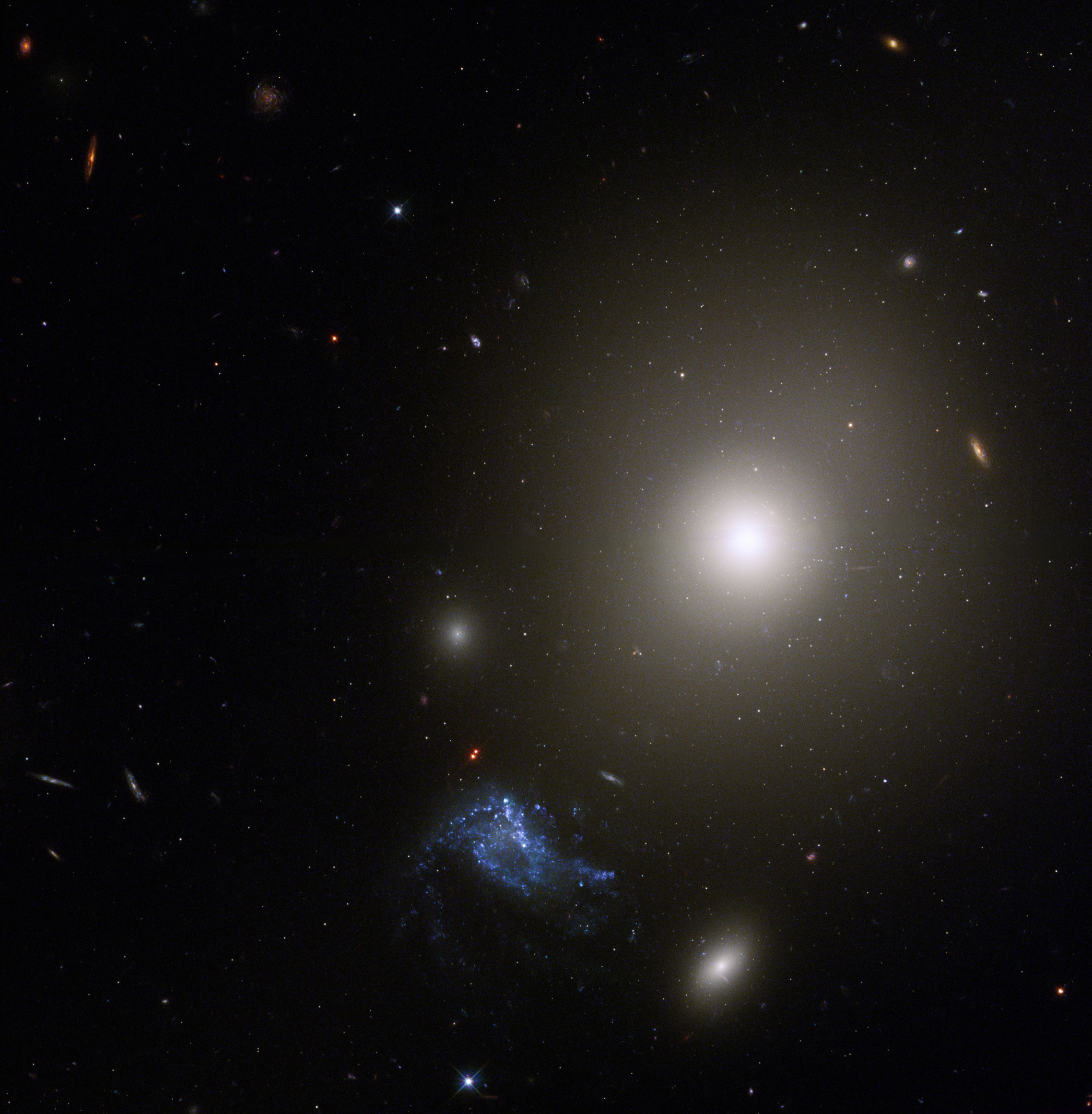
- Minkowski's Object (lower left bluish object) and NGC 541 imaged by the Hubble Space Telescope

Observation data (J2000 epoch)
- Constellation: Cetus
- Right ascension: 01^{h} 25^{m} 47^{s}
- Declination: −01° 22′ 20″
- Group or cluster: Abell 194

Other designations
- LEDA 73957, PGC 73957

Minkowski's Object (also known as LEDA 73957 or PGC 73957) is a dwarf irregular galaxy located in the constellation Cetus.

== Characteristics ==
It is located in the path of the radio jet of NGC 541 and is also located 45 arcseconds northeast of it. There is strong evidence that the jet has caused a starburst in Minkowski's Object. There is a H I region downstream from Minkowski's Object with a mass of 4.9×10^{8} M_{☉} that straddles the jet at the point where the jet changes direction. At least 20 regions with star clusters and associated H II regions have been detected in Minkowski's Object. The stellar population in Minkowski's Object is dominated by stars formed in a single event 7.5 million years ago. The current starbirth rate is 0.52 M_{☉} per year.

== Origin ==
Although it has been proposed that Minkowski's Object was a dwarf galaxy that happened to pass through the radio jet of NGC 541, it is more probable that the H I region was warm intergalactic gas that was cooled by the jet, resulting in star formation, a model that has been reproduced by computer simulations.
