= NGC 570 =

Galaxy in the constellation Cetus

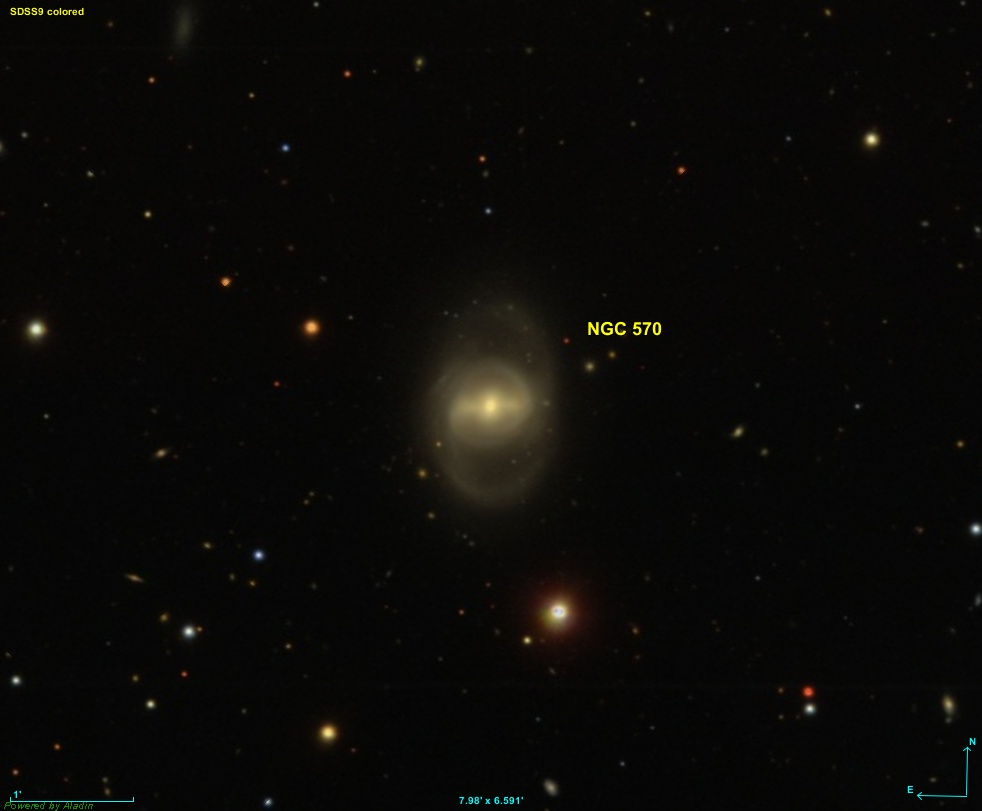
- SDSS image of NGC 570

Observation data (J2000 epoch)
- Constellation: Cetus
- Right ascension: 01^{h} 28^{m} 58.64210^{s}
- Declination: −00° 56′ 56.3223″
- Redshift: 0.01844
- Heliocentric radial velocity: 5477 km/s
- Distance: 250.2 ± 17.6 Mly (76.70 ± 5.39 Mpc)
- Apparent magnitude (B): 14.2

Characteristics
- Type: (R')SB(rs)a:

Other designations
- UGC 1061, MCG +00-04-162, PGC 5539

NGC 570 is a barred spiral galaxy. It is located in the constellation Cetus about 250 million light-years from the Milky Way. It was discovered by the American astronomer George Mary Searle in 1867.

One supernova has been observed in NGC 570: SN 2021qwh (type Ia, mag. 18.45).

== See also ==
- List of NGC objects (1–1000)
