= NGC 538 =

Galaxy in the constellation Cetus

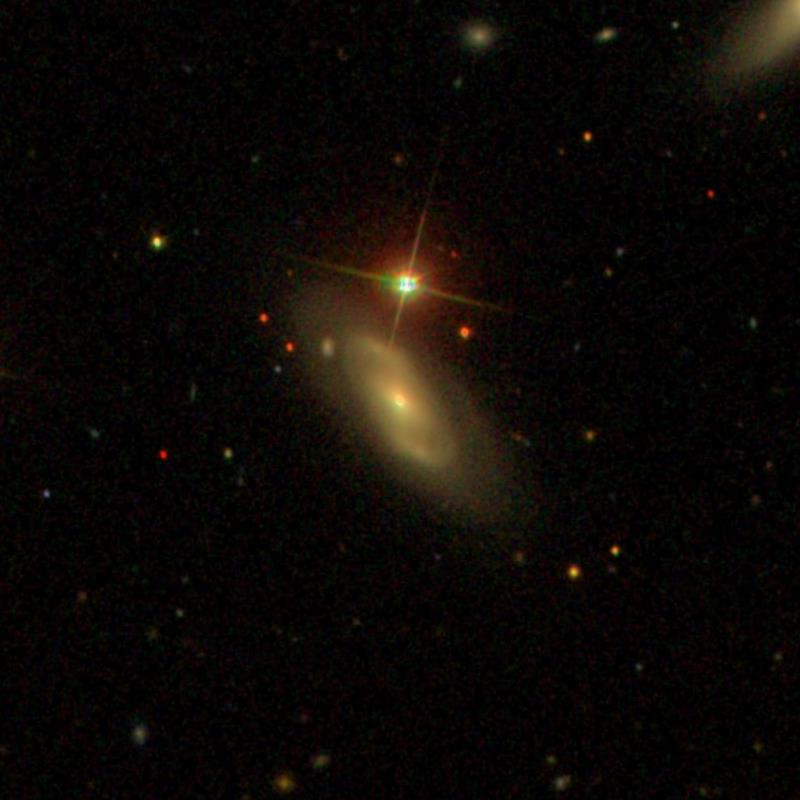
- SDSS image of NGC 538

Observation data (J2000 epoch)
- Constellation: Cetus
- Right ascension: 01^{h} 25^{m} 26.06364^{s}
- Declination: −01° 33′ 02.2258″
- Redshift: 0.017756
- Heliocentric radial velocity: 5276 km/s
- Distance: 250 Mly (77 Mpc)
- Apparent magnitude (B): 14.58

Characteristics
- Type: SB(s)ab:

Other designations
- UGC 991, MCG +00-04-130, PGC 5275

NGC 538 is a barred spiral galaxy in the constellation of Cetus. It is located about 250 million light-years from the Milky Way with a diameter of approximately 95,000 ly. NGC 538 was discovered by the American astronomer Lewis Swift in 1886.

NGC 538 is estimated to be about 2.5 billion years old.

== See also ==
- List of NGC objects (1–1000)
