= NGC 560 =

Galaxy in the constellation Cetus

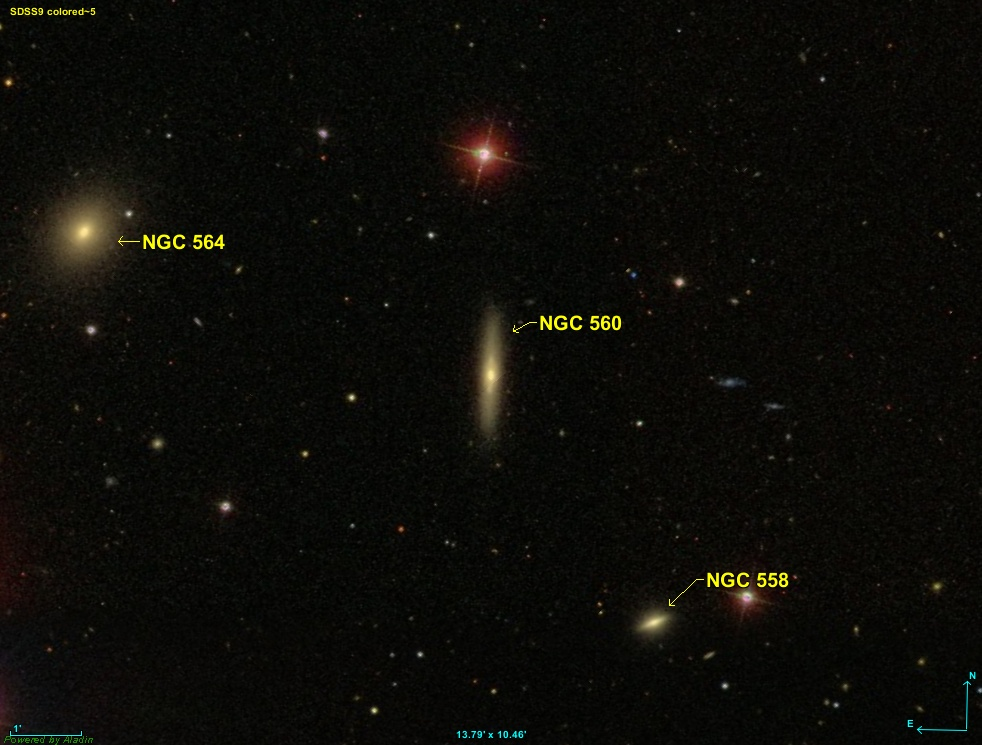
- NGC 560 imaged by SDSS

Observation data (J2000 epoch)
- Constellation: Cetus
- Right ascension: 01^{h} 27^{m} 25.434^{s}
- Declination: −01° 54′ 46.54″
- Redshift: 0.018289
- Heliocentric radial velocity: 5433 km/s
- Distance: 250.4 ± 17.6 Mly (76.78 ± 5.39 Mpc)
- Group or cluster: Abell 194
- Apparent magnitude (B): 14.0

Characteristics
- Type: S0^{0}
- Size: ~120,600 ly (36.98 kpc) (estimated)
- Apparent size (V): 2.0′ × 0.5′

Other designations
- UGC 1036, MCG +00-04-151, PGC 5430, CGCG 385-145

NGC 560 is a lenticular galaxy in the constellation Cetus. It is estimated to be about 250 million light-years from the Milky Way and has a diameter of approximately 120,000 light years. It is part of the Abell 194 galaxy cluster. NGC 560 was discovered by German-British astronomer William Herschel on October 1, 1785.

One supernova has been observed in NGC 560: SN 2024pnw (type Ia, mag. 18.29) was discovered by BlackGEM on July 13, 2024.

== See also ==
- List of NGC objects (1–1000)
