= NGC 547 =

Galaxy in the constellation Cetus

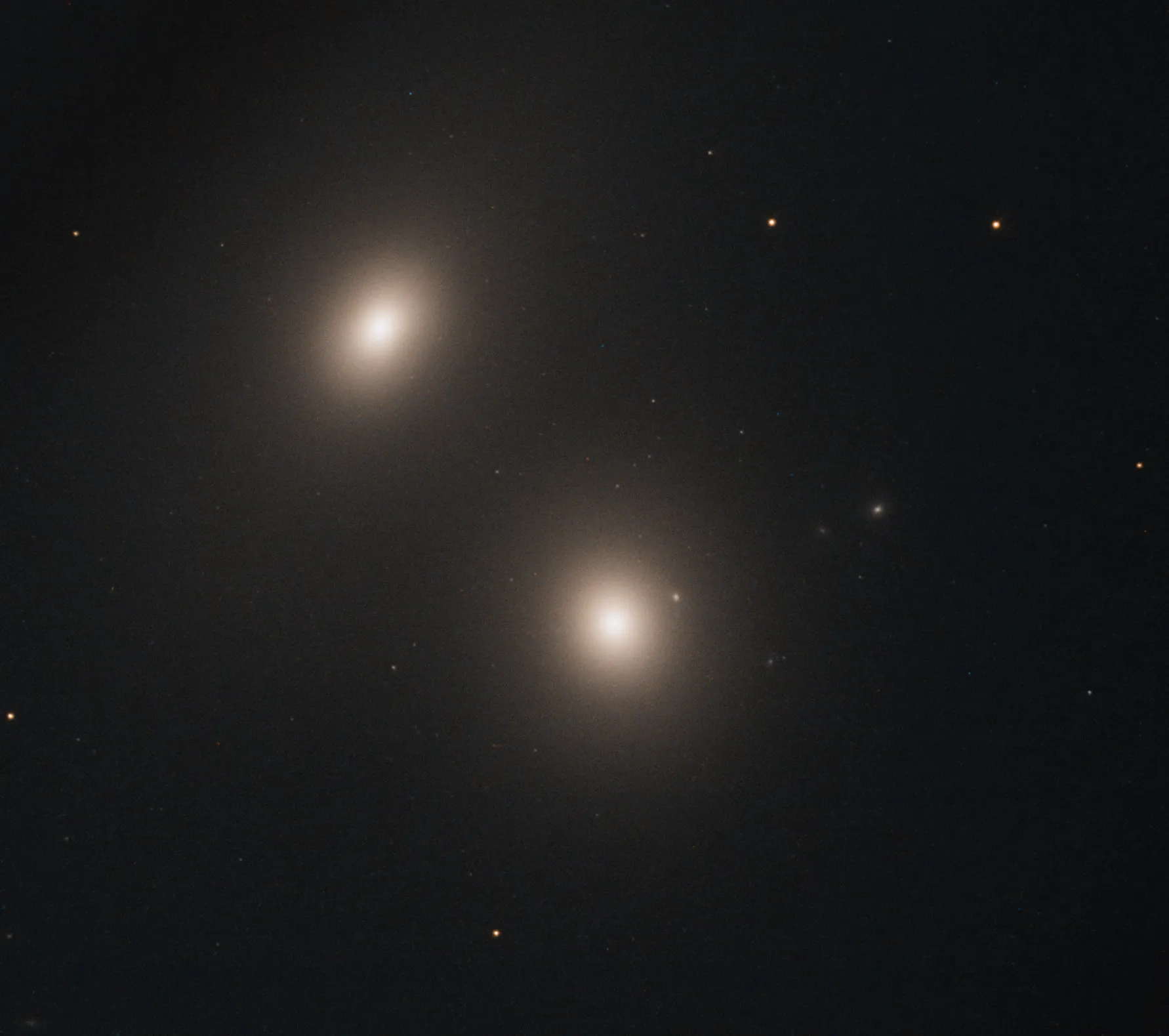
- NGC 547 (center) and NGC 545 (upper left) imaged by the Hubble Space Telescope

Observation data (J2000 epoch)
- Constellation: Cetus
- Right ascension: 01^{h} 26^{m} 00.6106^{s}
- Declination: −01° 20′ 42.471″
- Redshift: 0.018239 ± 0.000020
- Heliocentric radial velocity: 5,468 ± 6 km/s
- Distance: 213.99 ± 15.85 Mly (65.609 ± 4.861 Mpc)
- Group or cluster: Abell 194
- Apparent magnitude (V): 12.3

Characteristics
- Type: E1
- Size: ~146,700 ly (44.98 kpc) (estimated)
- Apparent size (V): 1.9′ × 1.8′

Other designations
- UGC 1009, 3C 40B, Arp 308, CGCG 385-132, MCG +00-04-142, PGC 5324

NGC 547 is an elliptical galaxy and radio galaxy (identified as 3C 40) located in the constellation Cetus. It is located at a distance of about 214 million light years from Earth, which, given its apparent dimensions, means that NGC 547 is about 147,000 light years across. It was discovered by German-British astronomer William Herschel on October 1, 1785. It is a member of the Abell 194 galaxy cluster and is included along with NGC 547 in the Atlas of Peculiar Galaxies.

NGC 547 is a prominent radio galaxy, with two large radio jets of Fanaroff-Riley class I with wide-angle tails. The galaxy is identified as 3C 40B (3C 40A is less prominent and is associated with the nearby galaxy NGC 541), and the source extends for 10 arcminutes in the south–north direction. A small, smooth, dark feature has been observed running across the nucleus in images by the Hubble Space Telescope. Its projected size is 0.3 kpc and its shape suggests it is the near side of a small dust disk.

NGC 547 forms a pair with the equally bright NGC 545, which lies 0.5 arcminutes away. They share a common envelope, however, despite their close position, no tidal features like tails or bridges have been observed. A stellar bridge has been detected between the galaxy pair and NGC 541, which lies 4.5 arcminutes to the southwest (projected distance circa 100 kpc).

Observations of the galaxy by the Chandra X-Ray Observatory revealed a large very luminous X-ray corona around the galaxy. The gas distribution appears symmetric, without evidence of tails, indicating its relatively low velocity, and thus it has been identified as the centre of the cluster, with NGC 541 and NGC 545 moving towards it.
