= NGC 585 =

Spiral galaxy in the constellation Cetus

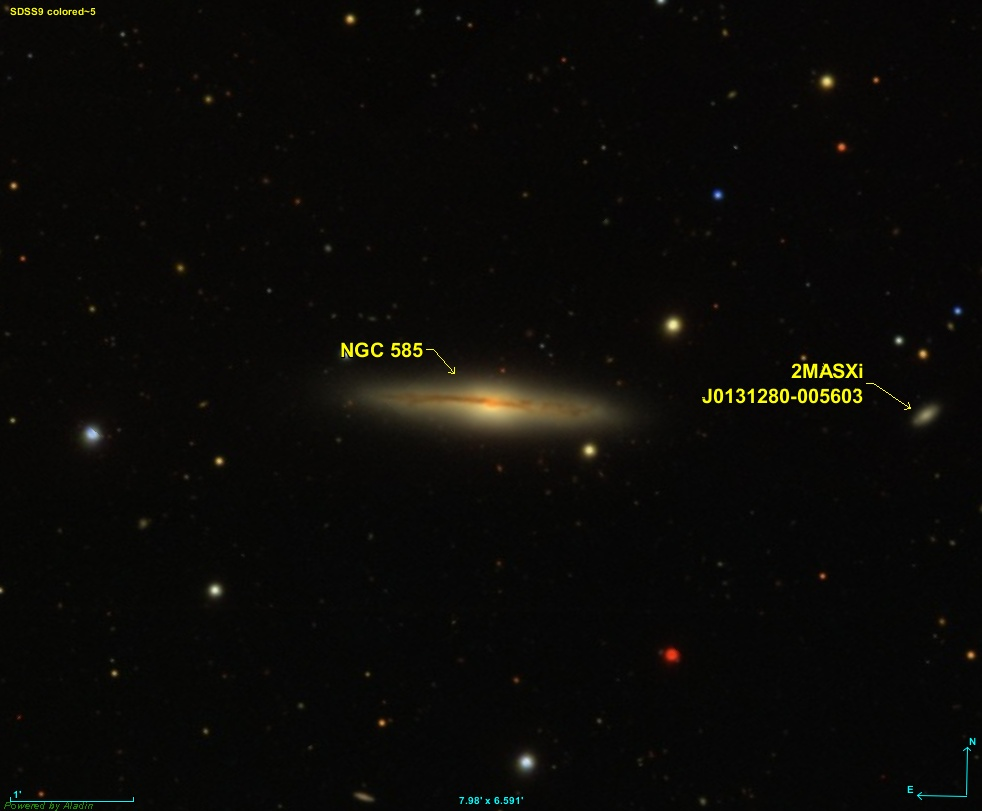
- NGC 585 imaged by the Sloan Digital Sky Survey

Observation data (J2000.0 epoch)
- Constellation: Cetus
- Right ascension: 01^{h} 31^{m} 42.103^{s}
- Declination: −00° 55′ 58.46″
- Redshift: 0.01812±0.00006
- Heliocentric radial velocity: 5,431.040930±18.886927
- Distance: 246.8 ± 17.3 kly (75.66 ± 5.31 kpc)h^{−1}_{0.73}

Characteristics
- Type: Sa (edge on)

Other designations
- UGC 1092, PGC 5688

NGC 585 is a spiral galaxy in the constellation of Cetus, which is about 245 million light-years from the Milky Way's center. The object was discovered on December 20, 1827, by the British astronomer John Frederick William Herschel.

== See also ==
- List of NGC objects (1–1000)
