= NGC 541 =

Galaxy in the constellation Cetus

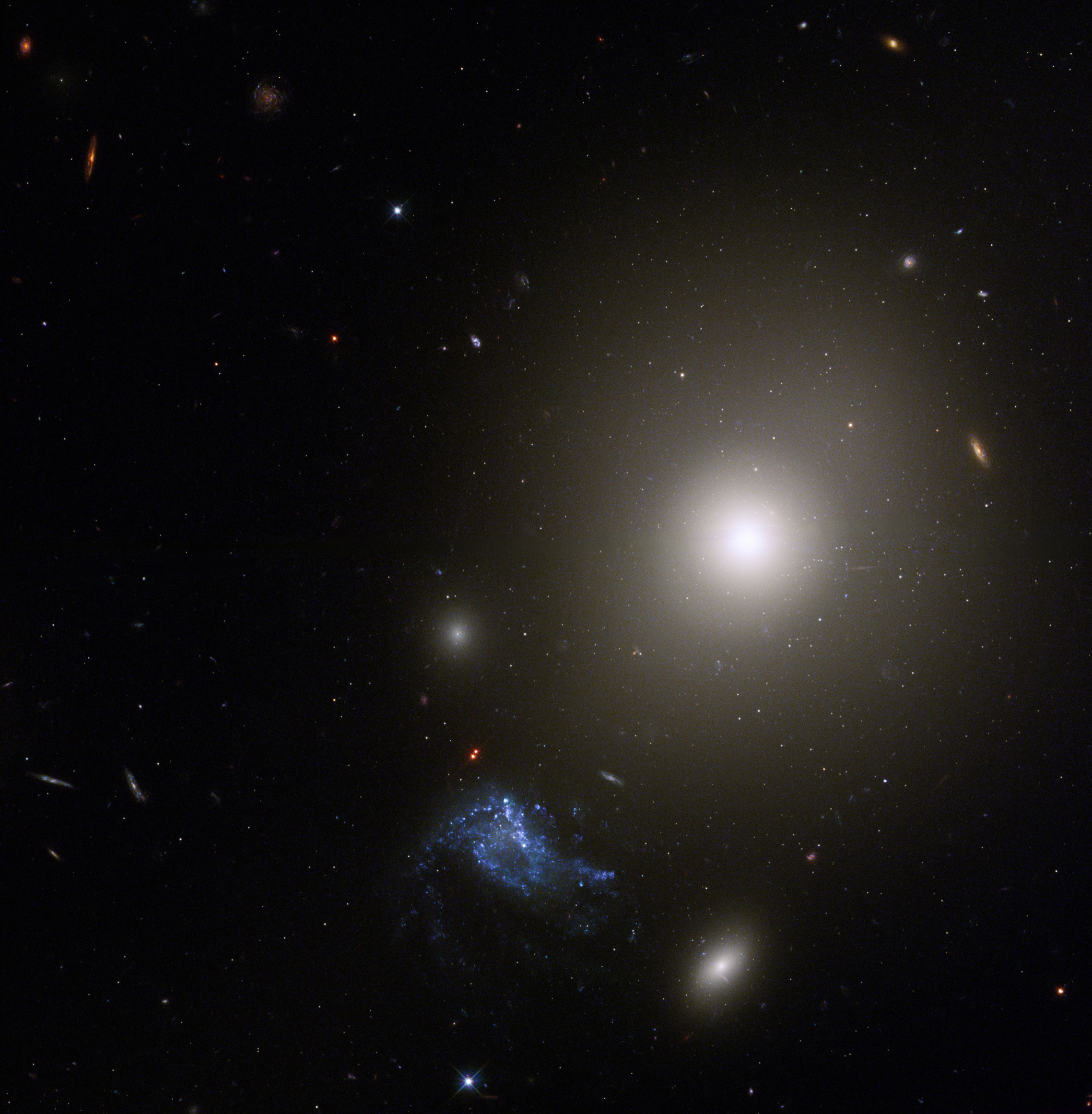
- NGC 541 and Minkowski's Object (lower left bluish object) imaged by the Hubble Space Telescope

Observation data (J2000 epoch)
- Constellation: Cetus
- Right ascension: 01^{h} 25^{m} 44.3001^{s}
- Declination: −01° 22′ 46.066″
- Redshift: 0.018086 ± 0.000019
- Heliocentric radial velocity: 5,422 ± 6 km/s
- Distance: 230.00 ± 14.47 Mly (70.519 ± 4.437 Mpc)
- Group or cluster: Abell 194
- Apparent magnitude (V): 12.2

Characteristics
- Type: cD;S0-
- Size: ~160,600 ly (49.23 kpc) (estimated)
- Apparent size (V): 1.8′ × 1.7′

Other designations
- Arp 133, UGC 1004, MCG +00-04-137, PGC 5305, CGCG 385-128

NGC 541 is a lenticular galaxy located in the constellation Cetus. It is located at a distance of about 230 million light years from Earth, which, given its apparent dimensions, means that NGC 541 is about 130,000 light years across. It was discovered by Heinrich d'Arrest on October 30, 1864. It is a member of the Abell 194 galaxy cluster and is included in the Atlas of Peculiar Galaxies in the category galaxies with nearby fragments. NGC 541 is a radio galaxy of Fanaroff–Riley class I, also known as 3C 40A (3C 40B is more prominent and is associated with the nearby galaxy NGC 547).

== Characteristics ==
NGC 541 has been observed by the Hubble Space Telescope. It was found that it has a central disk seen nearly face-on with a diameter of 1".8. Inside the disk is an inner ring with a diameter of circa 0".44 arcseconds, which may be part of a hardly visible spiral structure. There is also a linear dust feature sticking out of the disk with nearly the same axis as the radio jet. H-alpha and [N II] emission presented a peak at the centre of the dusk disk and also was found to form a ring around the peak, which had two brighter spots lying diametrically opposed. Observations in CO emission revealed the presence of molecular gas in NGC 541, with estimated mass of approximately 10^{8} M_{☉}, and with a compact ring-like distribution with a radius of 1–2 kpc. In the centre of NGC 541 lies a supermassive black hole whose mass is estimated to be (1.9 – 9.2) × 10^{8} M_{☉}.

== Supernovae ==
Two supernova have been observed near NGC 541:

- SN 2010ib (Type II, mag. 19.2) was discovered by the Lick Observatory Supernova Search (LOSS) on 5 September 2010, and independently by the Palomar Transient Factory on 4 August 2010. This supernova is thought to be associated with Minkowski's object.
- SN 2018ctv (Type Ia, mag. 17.2) was discovered by ASAS-SN on 21 June 2018. This supernova was located about halfway between NGC 541 and NGC 545, so it could be associated with either galaxy.

== Nearby galaxies ==
At 45 arcseconds northeast of NGC 541 lies an irregular dwarf galaxy known as Minkowski's Object. It is located in the path of the radio jet of NGC 541 and there is strong evidence that the jet has caused a starburst in Minkowski's Object. There is a HI region downstream from the Minkowski's Object with 4.9×10^{8} M_{☉} that straddles the jet at the point where the jet changes direction. At least 20 regions with star clusters and associated H II regions have been detected in Minkowski's object. The stellar population in Minkowski's Object is dominated by stars formed in a single event 7.5 million years ago. The current starbirth rate is 0.52 M_{☉} per year. Although it has been proposed that Minkowski's Object was a dwarf galaxy that happened to pass through the radio jet of NGC 541, it is more probable that the HI region was warm intergalactic gas that was cooled by the jet, resulting in star formation, a model that has been reproduced by computer simulations.

A stellar bridge has been detected between NGC 541 and the galaxy pair NGC 545/547, which lies 4.5 arcminutes to the northeast (projected distance about 100 kpc).

== See also ==
- List of NGC objects (1–1000)
