= NGC 545 =

Galaxy in the constellation Cetus

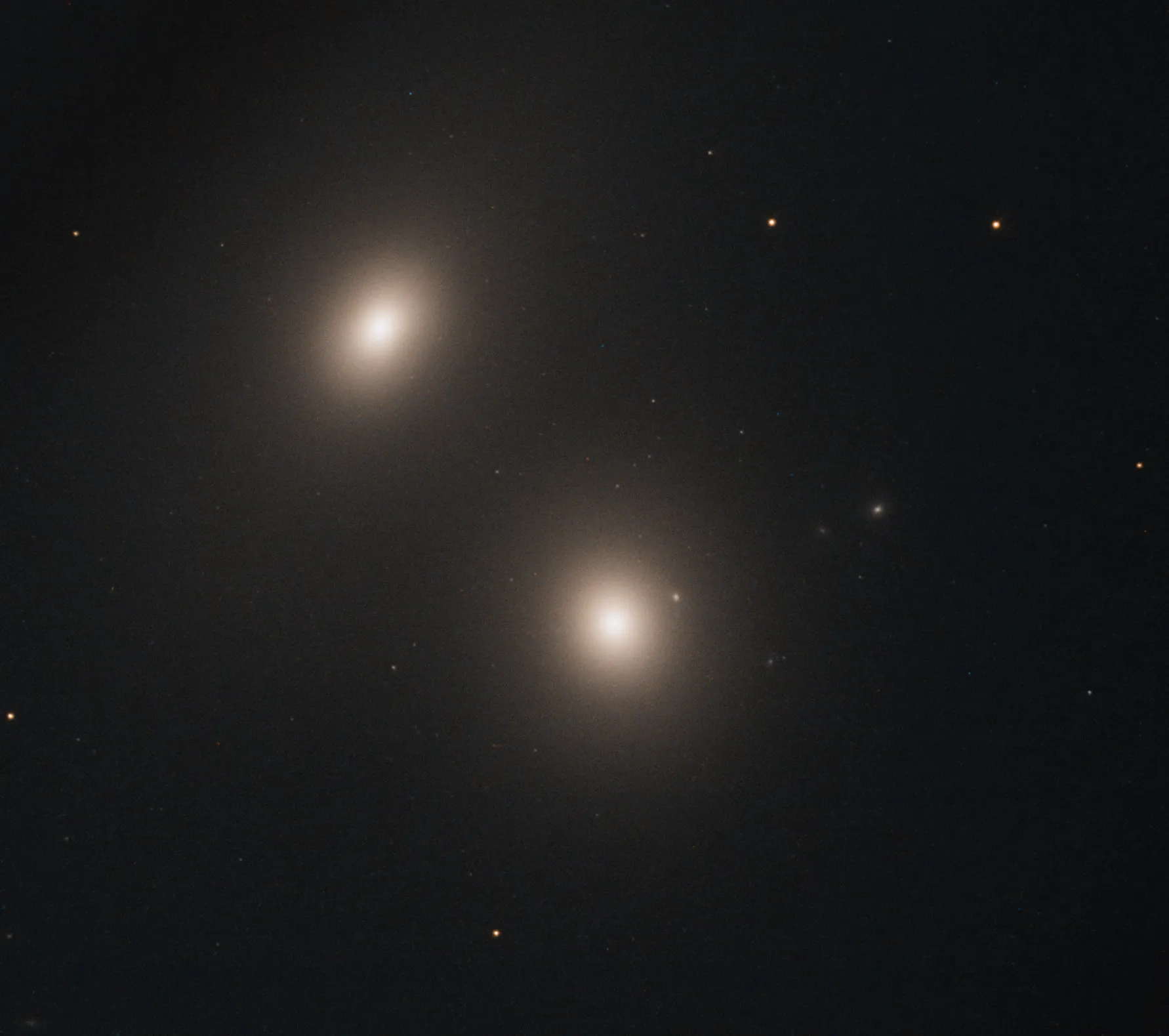
- NGC 545 (upper left) and NGC 547 (center) imaged by the Hubble Space Telescope

Observation data (J2000 epoch)
- Constellation: Cetus
- Right ascension: 01^{h} 25^{m} 59.1^{s}
- Declination: −01° 20′ 25″
- Redshift: 0.017806 ± 0.000025
- Heliocentric radial velocity: 5,338 ± 7 km/s
- Distance: 250 ± 55 Mly (78 ± 17 Mpc)
- Group or cluster: Abell 194
- Apparent magnitude (V): 12.3

Characteristics
- Type: SA0-
- Apparent size (V): 2.4′ × 1.6′

Other designations
- UGC 1007, Arp 308, CGCG 385-132, MCG +00-04-142, PGC 5323

NGC 545 is a lenticular galaxy located in the constellation Cetus. It is located at a distance of about 250 million light years from Earth, which, given its apparent dimensions, means that NGC 545 is about 180,000 light years across. It was discovered by German-British astronomer William Herschel on October 1, 1785. It is a member of the Abell 194 galaxy cluster and is included along with NGC 547 in the Atlas of Peculiar Galaxies.

A weak radio source with radio jets has been associated with NGC 545. The short jet crosses the much more prominent jet of NGC 547. Observations of the centre of the galaxy by Hubble Space Telescope did not reveal the presence of dust or disk features. In the centre of the galaxy is believed to exist a supermassive black hole whose mass is estimated to be about 600 million (10^{8.79}) M_{☉} based on the stellar tidal disruption rate.

NGC 545 forms a pair with the equally bright NGC 547, which lies 0.5 arcminutes away. They share a common envelope, however, despite their close position, no tidal features like tails or bridges have been observed. A stellar bridge has been detected between the galaxy pair and NGC 541, which lies 4.5 arcminutes to the southwest (projected distance circa 100 kpc).

Observations of the galaxy by the Chandra X-Ray Observatory revealed sharp surface brightness edges on the northeastern part of the galaxy and an extended tail in the soft band. It has been presumed that these are the result of motion of NGC 545 towards the centre of the cluster that has been identified as the location of NGC 547.
