= NGC 530 =

Lenticular galaxy in the constellation Cetus

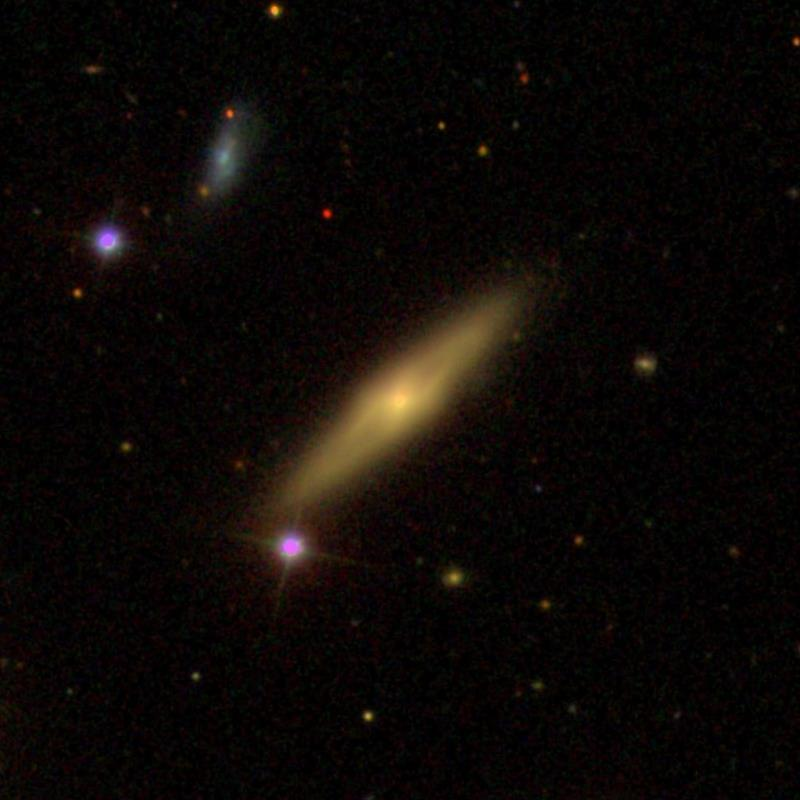
- NGC 530 (SDSS DR14)

Observation data (J2000 epoch)
- Constellation: Cetus
- Right ascension: 01^{h} 24^{m} 41.662^{s}
- Declination: −01° 35′ 13.59″
- Redshift: 0.016692
- Heliocentric radial velocity: 4962 km/s
- Distance: 230 Mly (71 Mpc)
- Group or cluster: Abell 194
- Apparent magnitude (B): 13.96
- Magnitude (J): 10.678
- Magnitude (H): 9.979
- Magnitude (K): 9.723

Characteristics
- Type: SB0^{+}
- Size: ~140,000 ly (42.91 kpc) (estimated)
- Apparent size (V): 1.5′ × 0.4′

Other designations
- IC 106, UGC 965, MCG +00-04-119, PGC 5210, CGCG 385-108

NGC 530, also known as IC 106, is a lenticular galaxy in the constellation Cetus. It is approximately 226 million light years from the Milky Way and has a diameter of around 140,000 light years. The object was discovered on November 20, 1886, by the American astronomer Lewis A. Swift, who listed it as NGC 530, and rediscovered on November 16, 1887, by Guillaume Bigourdan, who listed it as IC 106. It is a member of the Abell 194 galaxy cluster.

== NGC 530 group ==
NGC 530 is a member the NGC 530 group (also known as LGG 22), which contains at least 3 galaxies, including NGC 535, NGC 558 and NGC 530.

== See also ==
- List of NGC objects (1–1000)
