= NGC 4492 =

Spiral galaxy in the constellation Virgo

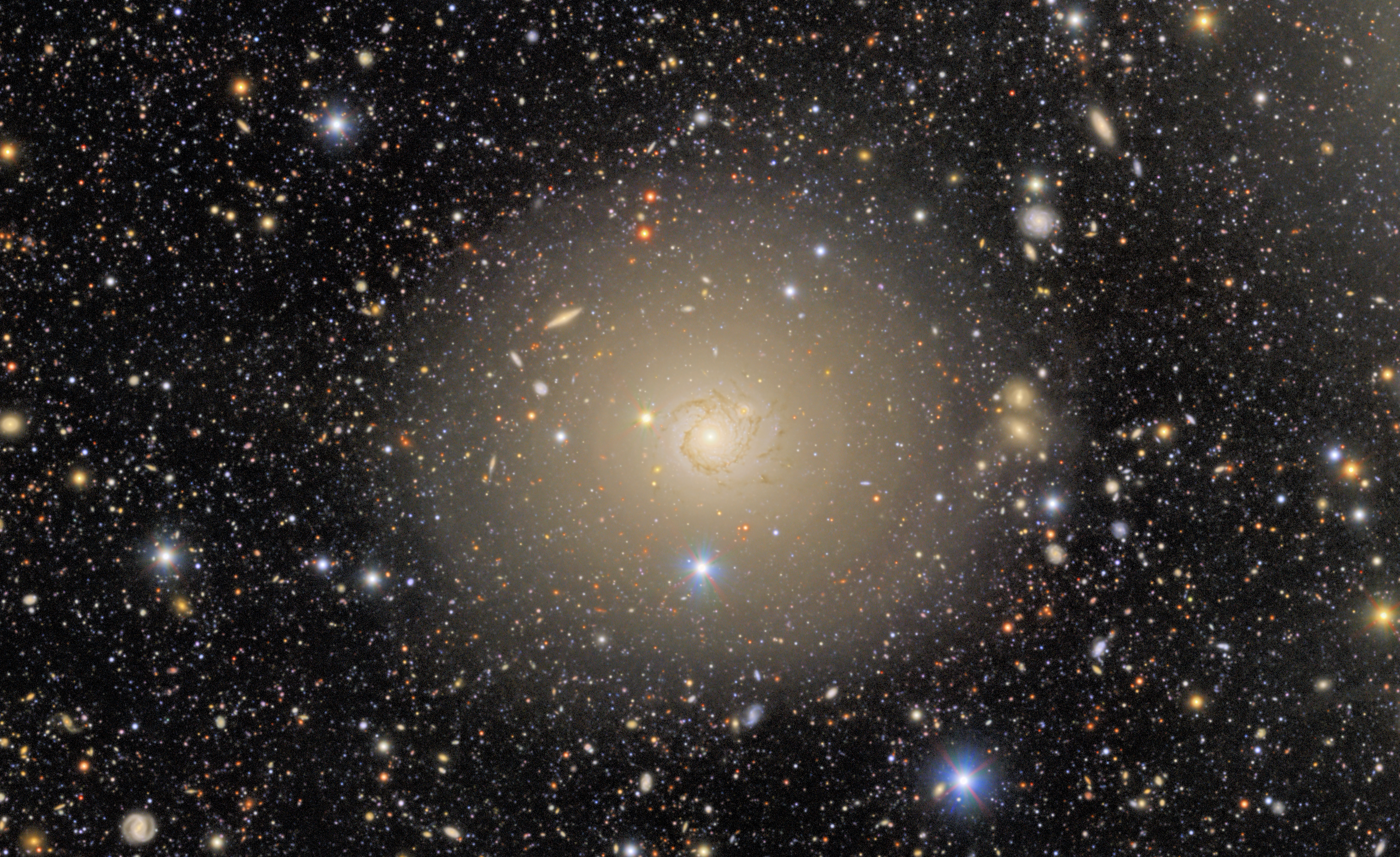
- NGC 4492 imaged by the Vera C. Rubin Observatory

Observation data (J2000 epoch)
- Constellation: Virgo
- Right ascension: 12^{h} 30^{m} 59.7^{s}
- Declination: 08° 04′ 40″
- Redshift: 0.005804/1740 km/s
- Distance: 90,950,000 ly
- Apparent magnitude (V): 13.0

Characteristics
- Type: SA(s)a?
- Size: ~33,450 ly (estimated)
- Apparent size (V): 1.58 x 1.25

Other designations
- IC 3438, PGC 41383, UGC 7656, VCC 1330

NGC 4492 is a spiral galaxy located about 90 million light-years away in the constellation Virgo. NGC 4492 was discovered by astronomer William Herschel on December 28, 1785. It was rediscovered by astronomer Arnold Schwassmann on January 23, 1900, and was listed as IC 3438. NGC 4492 lies in the direction of the Virgo Cluster. However, it is not considered to be a member of that cluster.

== Physical characteristics ==
NGC 4492 has a relatively large bulge while showing signs of weak spiral structure. The spiral arms are also outlined by lanes of interstellar dust.

== Virgo Cluster membership ==
NGC 4492 is listed in the Virgo Cluster Catalog as VCC 1330. However, distance estimates to the galaxy place it at a location far outside of the cluster's center. Also, its radial velocity indicates that NGC 4492 is not gravitationally bound to the Virgo Cluster but is expanding away from it. Therefore, NGC 4492 is not a member of the Virgo Cluster but rather a background galaxy.

== See also ==
- List of NGC objects (4001–5000)
- NGC 524
- NGC 613
- NGC 5248
- NGC 1079
