= NGC 502 =

Galaxy in the constellation Pisces

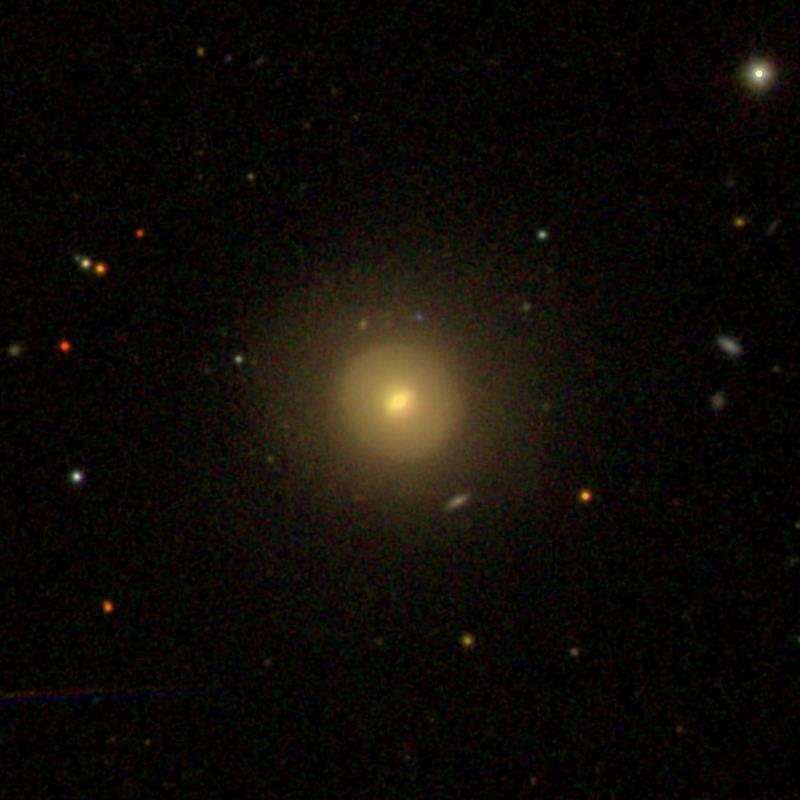
- SDSS view of NGC 502

Observation data (J2000 epoch)
- Constellation: Pisces
- Right ascension: 01^{h} 22^{m} 55.5^{s}
- Declination: +09° 02′ 57″
- Redshift: 0.008279 ± 0.000163
- Heliocentric radial velocity: (2472 ± 49) km/s
- Distance: 113 Mly
- Apparent magnitude (V): 12.7
- Apparent magnitude (B): 13.7
- Magnitude (J): 10.721
- Magnitude (H): 10.011
- Magnitude (K): 9.737

Characteristics
- Type: S0
- Apparent size (V): 1.1' × 1.0'

Other designations
- GC 293, 2MASS J01225553+0902570, UGC 922, PGC 5034

NGC 502, also occasionally referred to as PGC 5034 or UGC 922, is a lenticular galaxy in the constellation Pisces. It is located approximately 113 million light-years from the Solar System and was discovered on 25 September 1862 by German astronomer Heinrich Louis d'Arrest. When the Morphological Catalogue of Galaxies was published between 1962 and 1974, the identifications of NGC 502 and NGC 505 were reversed. In reality, NGC 502 is equal to MGC +01-04-041 and not MCG +01-04-043 as noted in the catalogue.

== Observation history ==
Arrest discovered NGC 502 using an 11" reflecting telescope in Copenhagen. His position, which he measured on four separate nights, matches with both UGC 922 and PGC 5034. John Louis Emil Dreyer, creator of the New General Catalogue, described the galaxy as "considerably bright, small, round, brighter middle and nucleus".

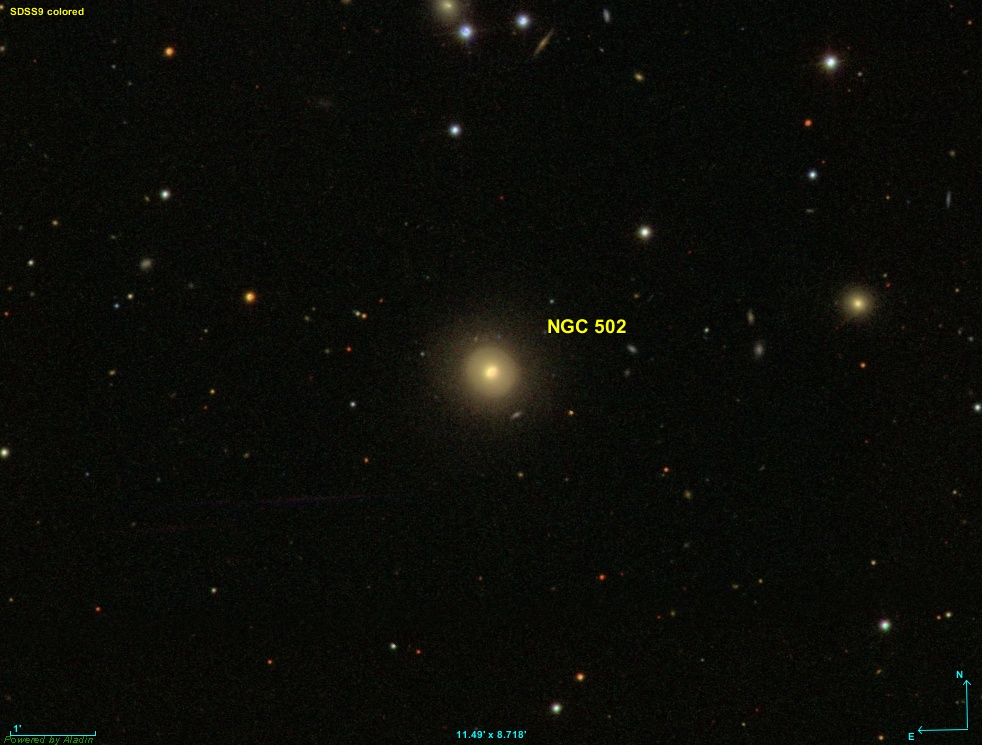
NGC 502 (SDSS)

== Galaxy Group and Environment ==
NGC 502 is part of a Galaxy group known as LGG 23. It consists of at least 9 members, namely NGC 489, NGC 516 and NGC 524. LGG 20 lies in the same field of view as NGC 502.

== See also ==
- Elliptical galaxy
- List of NGC objects (1–1000)
- Pisces (constellation)
