= NGC 516 =

Lenticular galaxy in the constellation Pisces

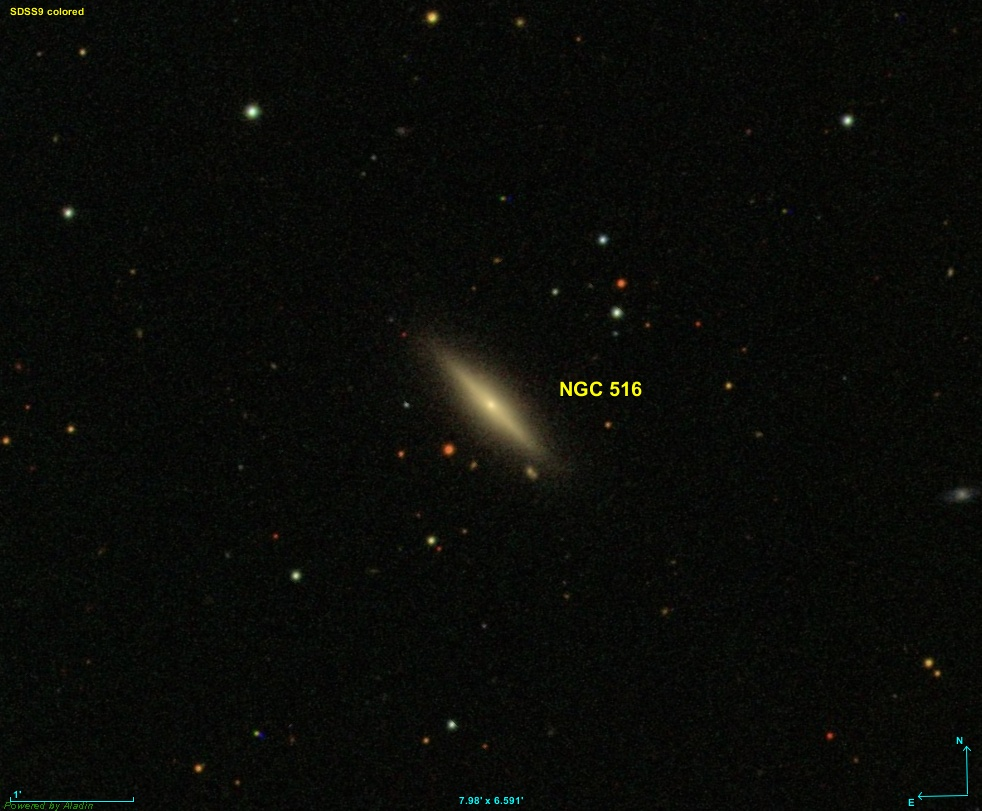
- NGC 516 as seen by SDSS

Observation data (J2000 epoch)
- Constellation: Pisces
- Right ascension: 01^{h} 24^{m} 08.1^{s}
- Declination: +09° 33′ 06″
- Redshift: 0.008129
- Heliocentric radial velocity: 2,437 km/s
- Apparent magnitude (V): 14.13
- Magnitude (J): 11.370
- Magnitude (H): 10.747
- Magnitude (K): 10.518

Characteristics
- Type: S0
- Apparent size (V): 1.4' × 0.5'

Other designations
- UGC 946, CGCG 411-046, MCG +01-04-048, 2MASX J01240806+0933060, PGC 5148

NGC 516 is a lenticular galaxy located in the constellation of Pisces. It was discovered on September 25, 1862, by Heinrich d'Arrest.

== NGC 524 group ==
NGC 516 is a member the NGC 524 group (also known as LGG 23), which contains at least 9 galaxies, including NGC 489, NGC 502 and NGC 524.

== See also ==
- List of NGC objects (1–1000)
