= NGC 1079 =

Galaxy in the constellation Fornax

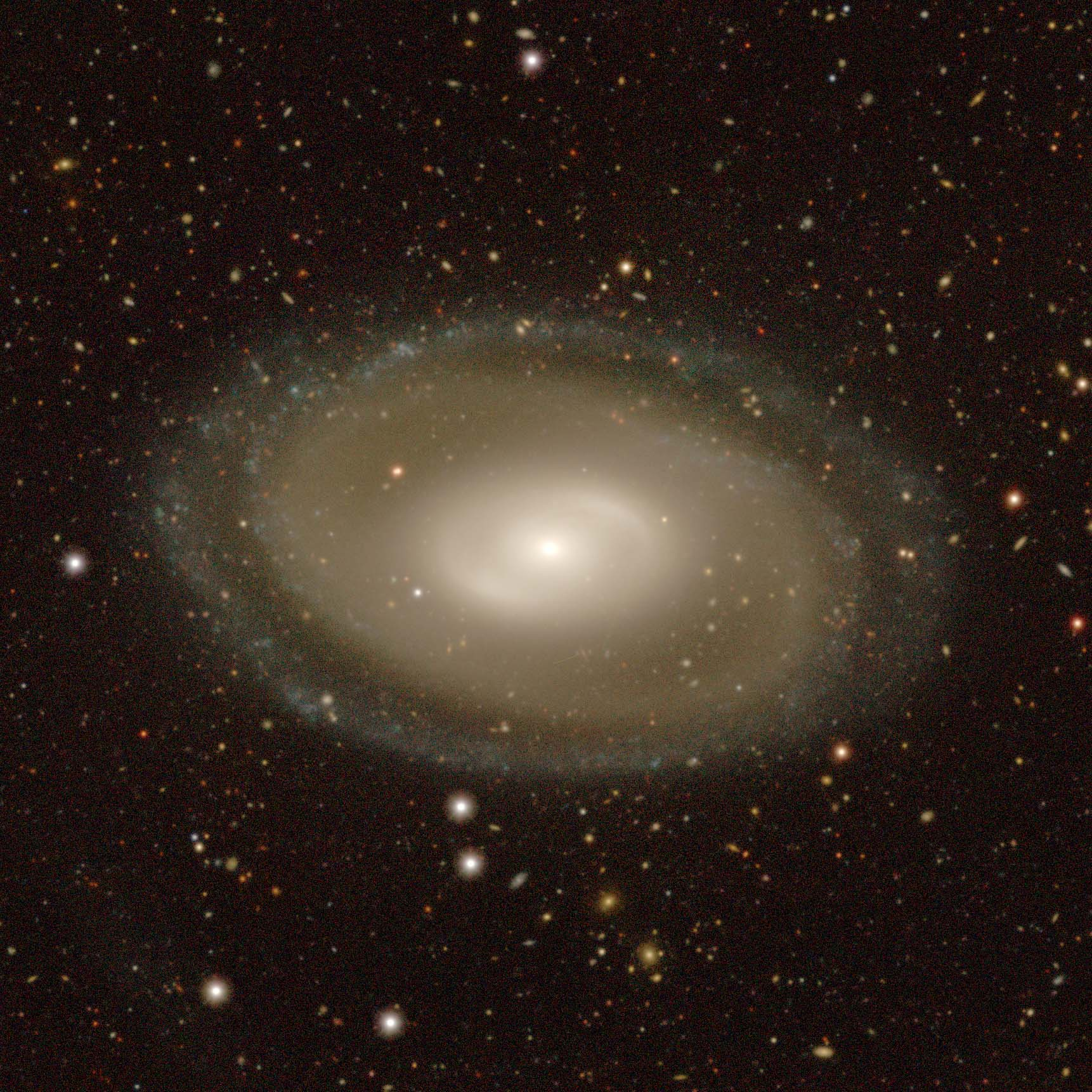

Observation data (J2000 epoch)
- Constellation: Fornax
- Right ascension: 02^{h} 43^{m} 44.3^{s}
- Declination: −29° 00′ 12″
- Redshift: 0.004843 ± 0.000017 km/s
- Distance: ~61,5 Mly (18.8 ± 1.3 Mpc)
- Apparent magnitude (V): 11.5
- Apparent magnitude (B): 12.4
- Surface brightness: 14.4 mag/arcmin^{2}

Characteristics
- Apparent size (V): 5.50 x 3.1 arcmin

Other designations
- ESO 416-13, MCG -5-7-17, IRAS02415-2913, PGC 10330

NGC 1079 is an isolated, weakly barred, grand-design spiral galaxy with transitional ring-like structures containing a number of prominent A type stars. It is located in the constellation Fornax and is part of the Eridanus supercluster. It was first observed and catalogued by the astronomer John Herschel in 1835.

== Characteristics ==
NGC 1079 has unique characteristics when compared to other galaxies with a similar luminosity. Its H l content per unit blue luminosity is three times higher. Its mass and rotation velocity is twice as large as normal and it has a low surface brightness in its spiral arms, exterior to a high surface brightness center dominated by old stars. A study suggests these characteristics occur due to a luminous matter deficiency relative to its dynamical mass within the Holmberg radius.

== Ring structure and star formation ==
Astronomers first identified NGC 1079's ring structure in 1996 by studying its HST ultraviolet imaging. Later studies have shown virtually all the star-formation activity in this galaxy occurs inside the ring.

== See also ==
Other galaxies with star-forming rings include:

- NGC 613
- NGC 5248
- NGC 4492
- NGC 1300
