= NGC 489 =

Spiral galaxy in the constellation Pisces

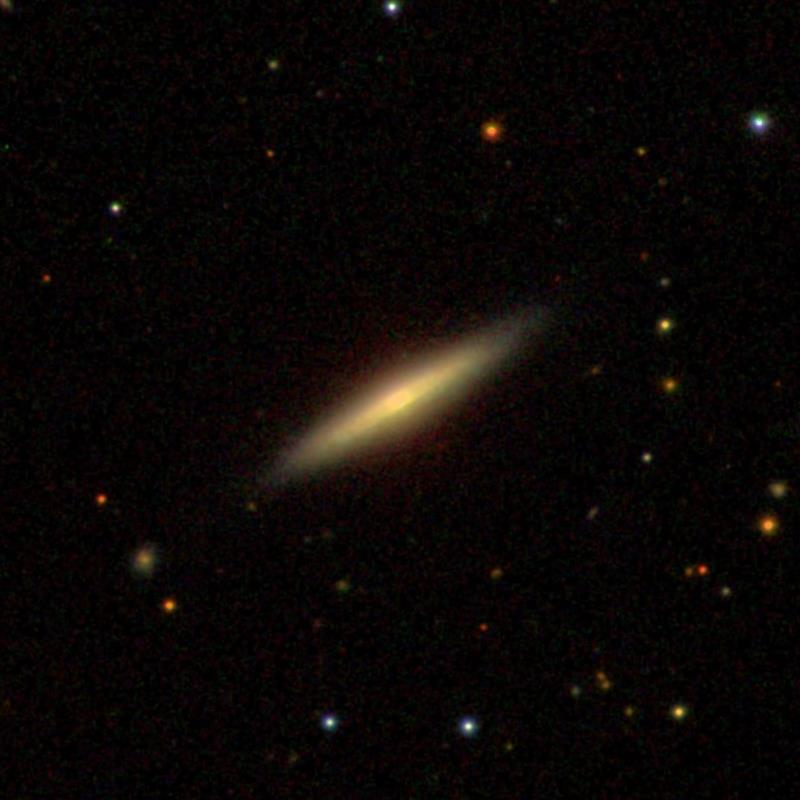
- SDSS image of NGC 489

Observation data (J2000 epoch)
- Constellation: Pisces
- Right ascension: 01^{h} 21^{m} 53.9^{s}
- Declination: 09° 12′ 24″
- Redshift: 0.008362/2507 km/s
- Distance: 97 million ly
- Apparent magnitude (V): 13.55
- Magnitude (J): 10.521
- Magnitude (H): 9.828
- Magnitude (K): 9.558

Characteristics
- Type: S?
- Apparent size (V): 1.7′ x 0.4″

Other designations
- CGCG 411-34, MCG 1-4-34, PGC 4957, UGC 908

NGC 489 is probably an edge-on spiral galaxy located about 97 million Light-years away from Earth in the constellation Pisces. NGC 489's calculated velocity is 2507 km/s. NGC 489 was discovered by German astronomer Heinrich Louis d'Arrest on December 22, 1862.

== Group Membership ==
NGC 489 is a member of a group of galaxies known as the NGC 524 group. It consists of at least 9 members, which are NGC 489, NGC 502, NGC 516 and NGC 524. LGG 20 lies in the same field of view as NGC 489.

== See also ==
- Spiral galaxy
- List of NGC objects (1–1000)
