= NGC 5248 =

Spiral galaxy in the constellation Boötes

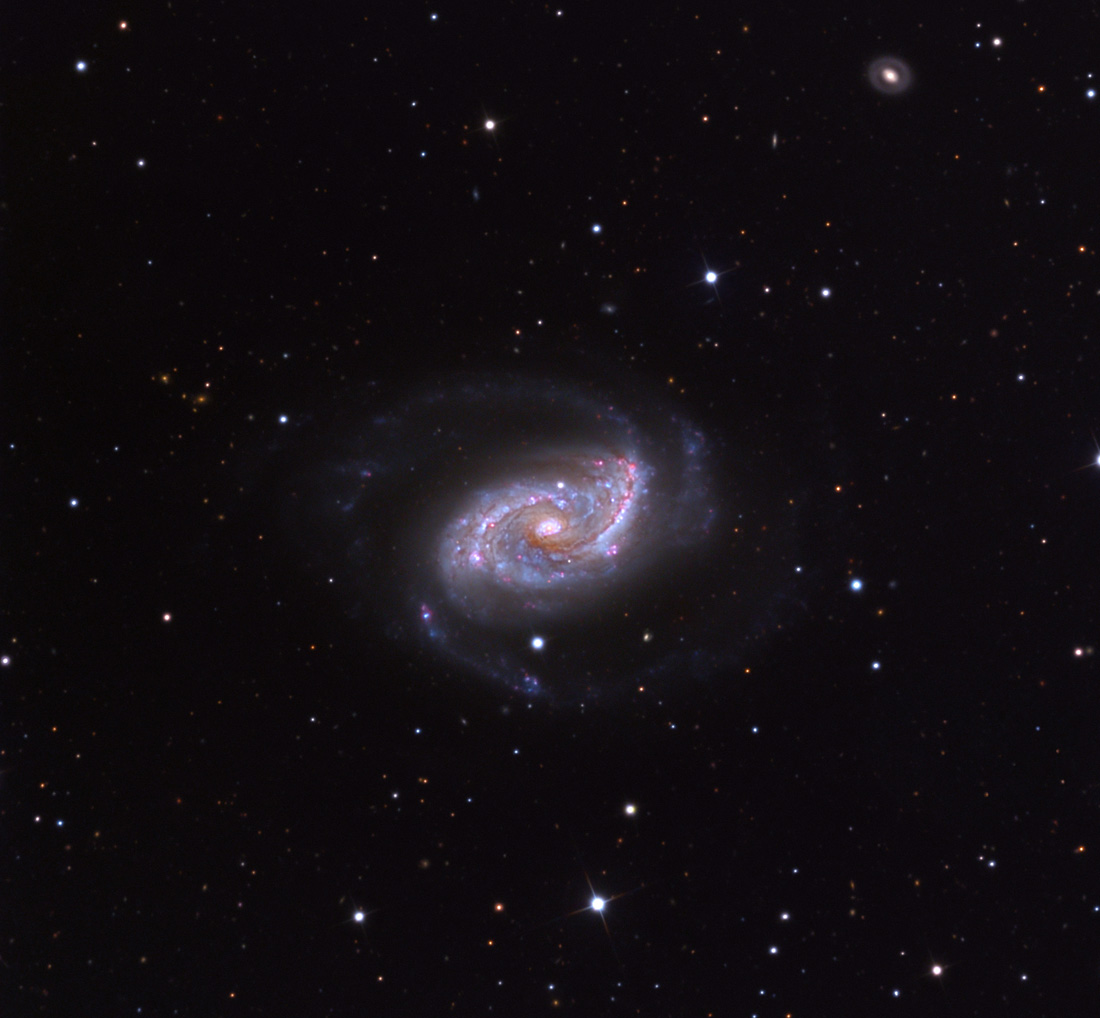
- NGC 5248 imaged with a 32-inch telescope

Observation data (J2000 epoch)
- Constellation: Boötes
- Right ascension: 13^{h} 37^{m} 32.0235^{s}
- Declination: +08° 53′ 06.907″
- Redshift: 1151 ± 1 km/s
- Distance: 69.1 ± 4.9 Mly (21.19 ± 1.51 Mpc)
- Apparent magnitude (V): 10.97

Characteristics
- Type: SAB(rs)bc
- Size: ~84,600 ly (25.93 kpc) (estimated)
- Apparent size (V): 6.2′ × 4.5′

Other designations
- Caldwell 45, IRAS 13350+0908, UGC 8616, MCG +02-35-015, PGC 48130, CGCG 073-054

NGC 5248 (also known as Caldwell 45) is a compact intermediate spiral galaxy in the constellation Boötes. Its velocity with respect to the cosmic microwave background is 1437 ± 20 km/s, which corresponds to a Hubble distance of 69.1 ± 4.9 Mly (21.19 ± 1.51 Mpc). However, 17 non redshift measurements give a much closer distance of 42.52 ± 3.16 Mly (13.038 ± 0.969 Mpc). It was discovered on 15 April 1784 by German-British astronomer William Herschel.

NGC 5248 is a member of the NGC 5248 Group of galaxies, itself one of the Virgo III Groups strung out to the east of the Virgo Supercluster of galaxies.

== Image Gallery ==
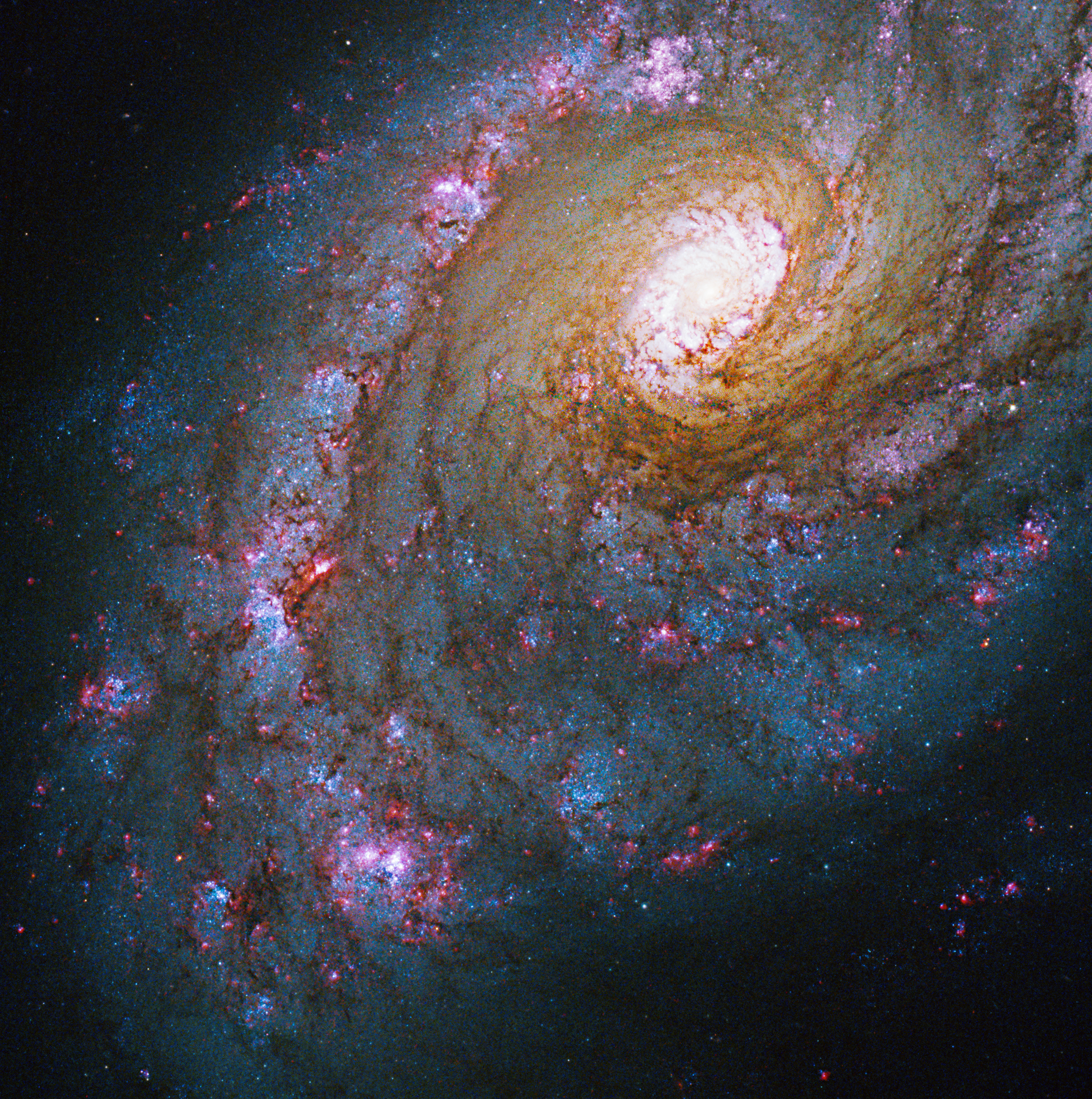
NGC 5248 imaged by the Hubble Space Telescope, 2020.

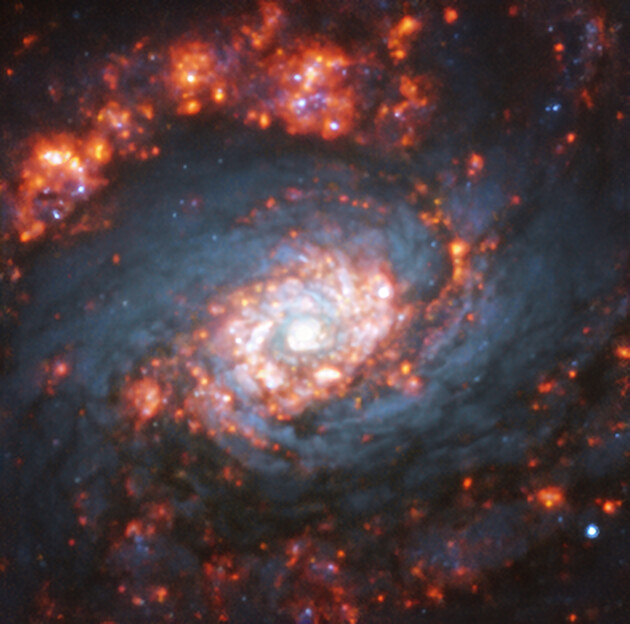
Multi spectral image, Very Large Telescope

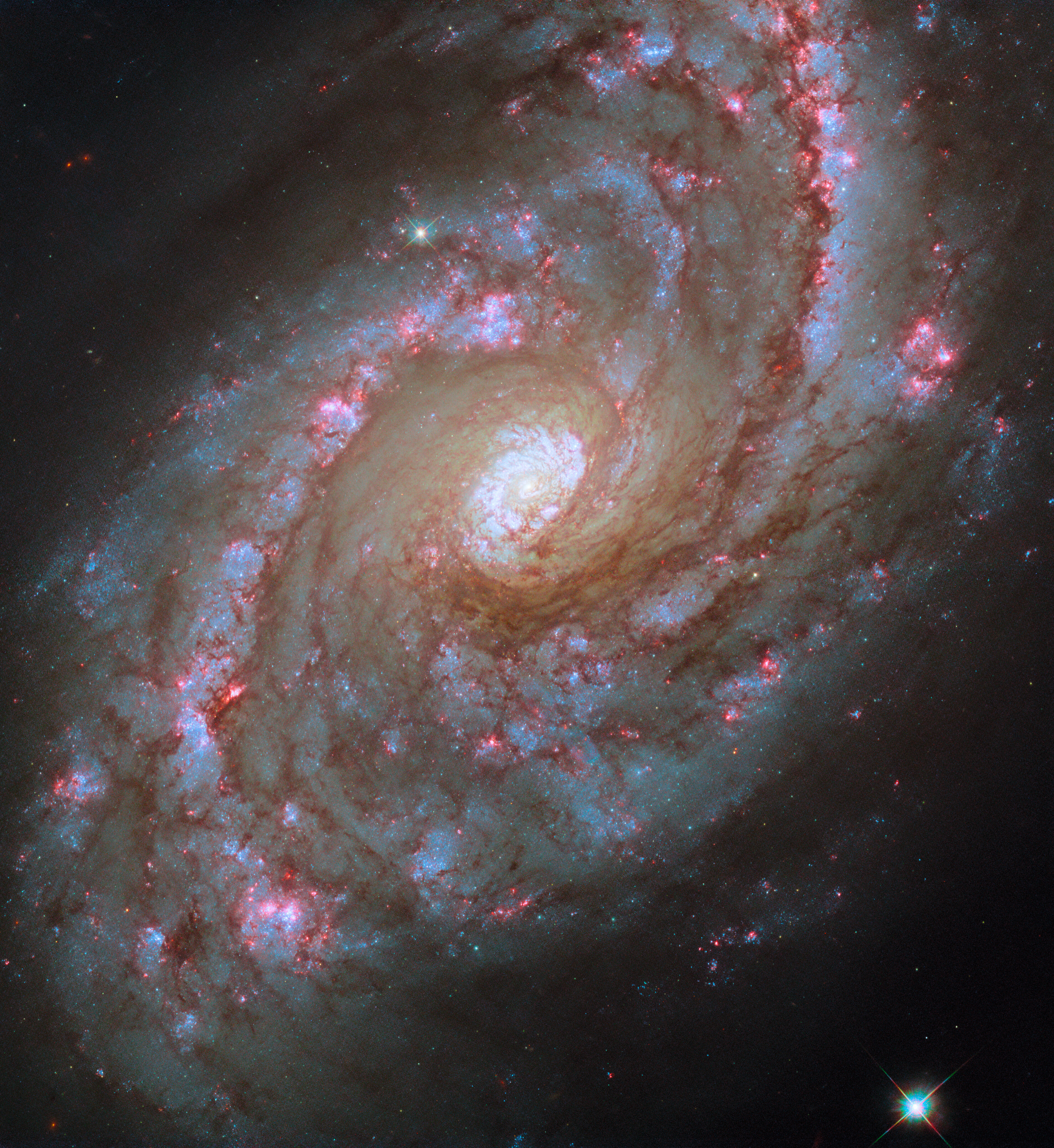
Imaged by the Hubble Space Telescope, 2024.

== See also ==
- List of NGC objects (5001–6000)
- NGC 613
- NGC 1079
- NGC 4492
- NGC 1300
