= NGC 613 =

Galaxy in the constellation of Sculptor

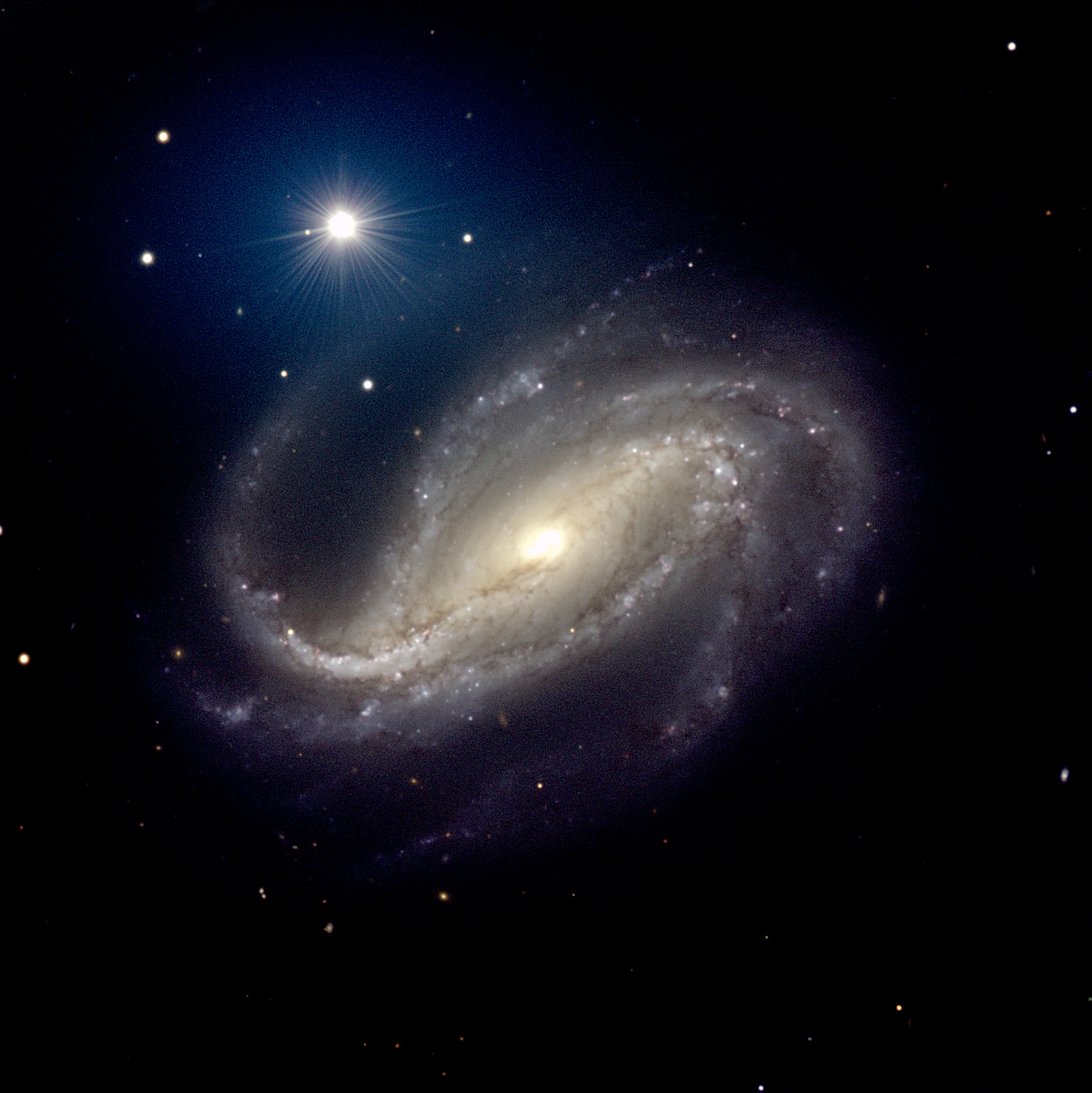
- NGC 613 imaged from the Paranal Observatory in Chile. The prominent star at upper left is HD 9693.

Observation data (J2000 epoch)
- Constellation: Sculptor
- Right ascension: 01^{h} 34^{m} 18.235^{s}
- Declination: –29° 25′ 06.56″
- Redshift: 0.004940±0.0000167
- Heliocentric radial velocity: +1,487
- Distance: 67.5 Mly (20.7 Mpc)
- Apparent magnitude (V): 10.0

Characteristics
- Type: SB(rs)bc
- Size: ~149,100 ly (45.70 kpc) (estimated)
- Apparent size (V): 5.2′ × 2.6′

Other designations
- ESO 413- G 011, IRAS 01319-2940, MCG -05-04-044, PGC 5849, VV 824

NGC 613 is a barred spiral galaxy located 67 million light years away in the southern constellation of Sculptor. The galaxy was discovered by German-English astronomer William Herschel on 9 December 1798, then re-discovered and catalogued by Scottish astronomer James Dunlop on 5 August 1826. It was first photographed in 1912, which revealed the spiral form of the nebula. During the twentieth century, radio telescope observations showed that a linear feature in the nucleus was a relatively strong source of radio emission.

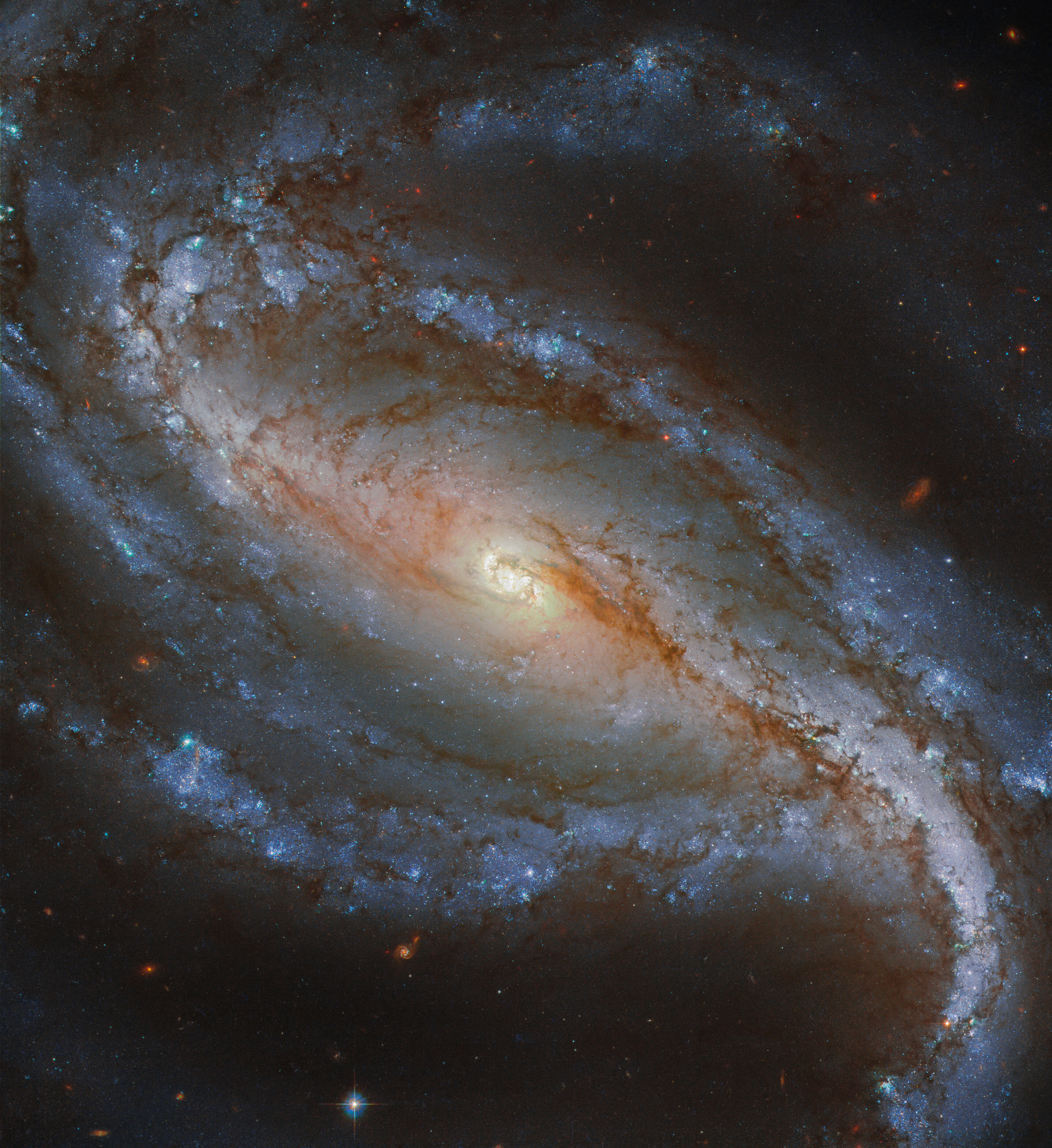
Hubble image of NGC 613 showing the prominent bar and loosely wound arms

NGC 613 is inclined by an angle of 37° to the line of sight from the Earth along a position angle of 125°. The morphological classification of NGC 613 is SBbc(rs), indicating that it is a spiral galaxy with a bar across the nucleus (SB), a weak inner ring structure circling the bar (rs), and moderate to loosely wound spiral arms (bc). The bar is relatively broad but irregular in profile with a position angle that varies from 115–124° and dust lanes located along the leading edges. Star formation is occurring at the ends of the bar and extending along the well-defined spiral arms. The central bulge is readily apparent, with a radius of 14″.

The classification of the nucleus is of type HII, indicating a match to the spectrum of an H II region. Near the core, the stars have a velocity dispersion of 136 ± 20 km/s. The nucleus is a source of radio emission with the form of an inner ring with a radius of about 1,100 ly (350 pc) and a linear feature that is perhaps perpendicular to it. The latter consists of three discrete blobs spanning approximately 2,000 ly (600 pc). Observations suggest the presence of a supermassive black hole at the core with a mass in the range (1.9–9.6) × 10^{7} times the mass of the Sun.

== SN 2016gkg ==
On September 20, 2016, Argentinian amateur astronomer Victor Buso captured supernova SN 2016gkg in NGC 613, just as it was starting to erupt. This was a Type IIb supernova, a supernova that initially shows a hydrogen envelope like a Type II supernova, but later loses the hydrogen lines in its spectrum to appear like a Type Ib supernova. It showed the double peak that is common to many Type IIb supernovae, rising to around magnitude 15.5 shortly after discovery and then again about 20 days later. The progenitor star has been identified in Hubble Space Telescope images from before its collapse, and it is likely to have been a yellow supergiant.

== See also ==
- NGC 1079
- NGC 5248
- NGC 4492
- NGC 1300
- List of NGC objects (1–1000)
