= NGC 524 =

Lenticular galaxy in the constellation Pisces

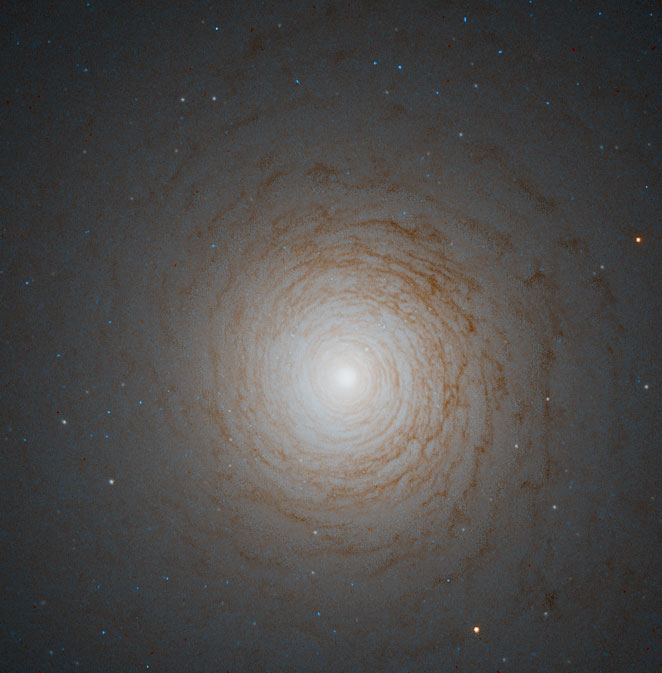
- NGC 524 imaged by the Hubble Space Telescope

Observation data (J2000 epoch)
- Constellation: Pisces
- Right ascension: 01^{h} 24^{m} 47.7^{s}
- Declination: +09° 32′ 20″
- Redshift: 2,403 ± 5 km/s
- Distance: 86.1 ± 13.7 Mly (26.4 ± 4.2 Mpc)
- Apparent magnitude (V): 10.4

Characteristics
- Type: SA(rs)0+
- Apparent size (V): 2.8′ × 2.8′

Other designations
- UGC 968, PGC 5222

NGC 524 is a lenticular galaxy in the constellation Pisces. It is at a distance of about 90 million light-years away from Earth. In the central bulge of the galaxy is visible gas forming a spiral structure. It is the largest galaxy in the small NGC 524 group of galaxies, which is associated with NGC 488 and its group. It was discovered by William Herschel on 4 September 1786.

== NGC 524 group ==
NGC 524 is a member the NGC 524 group (also known as LGG 23), which contains at least 9 galaxies, including NGC 489, NGC 502 and NGC 516.

== Observation ==
On 4 May 1985 (the May 1985 lunar eclipse) it was occulted by the Moon during a Total Lunar Eclipse over South Africa and Antarctica.

=== Supernovae ===
Two supernovae have been observed in the galaxy:

- SN 2000cx (Type Ia-pec, mag. 14.5) was discovered by the Lick Observatory Supernova Search (LOSS) on 17 July 2000. This supernova reached magnitue 13.1, and was the brightest observed in the year 2000.
- SN 2008Q (Type Ia, mag. 16.5) was discovered by Giancarlo Cortini on 26 January 2008.

== Gallery ==
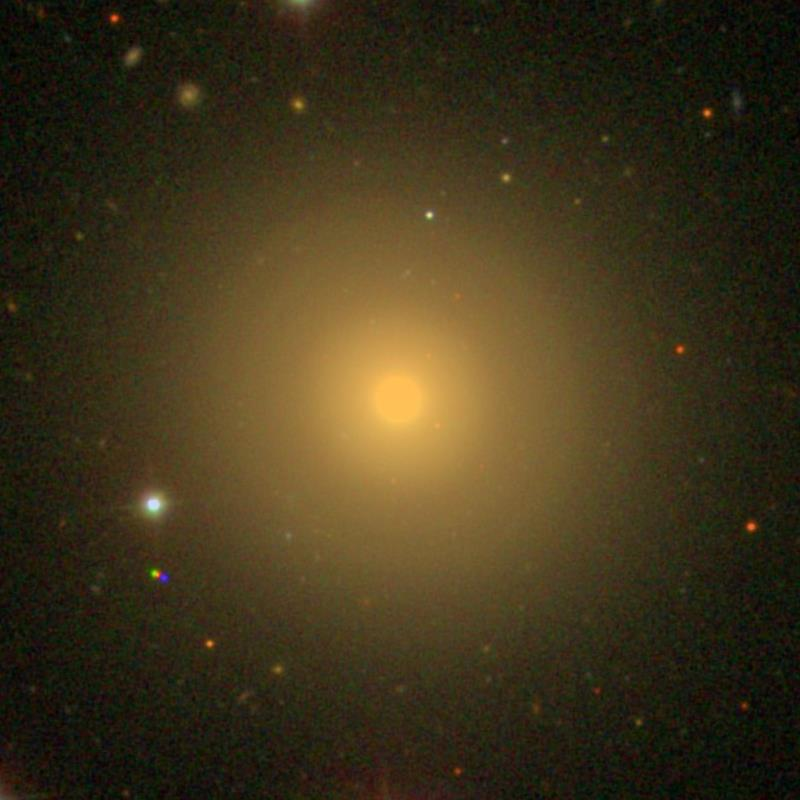
NGC 524 (SDSS DR14)

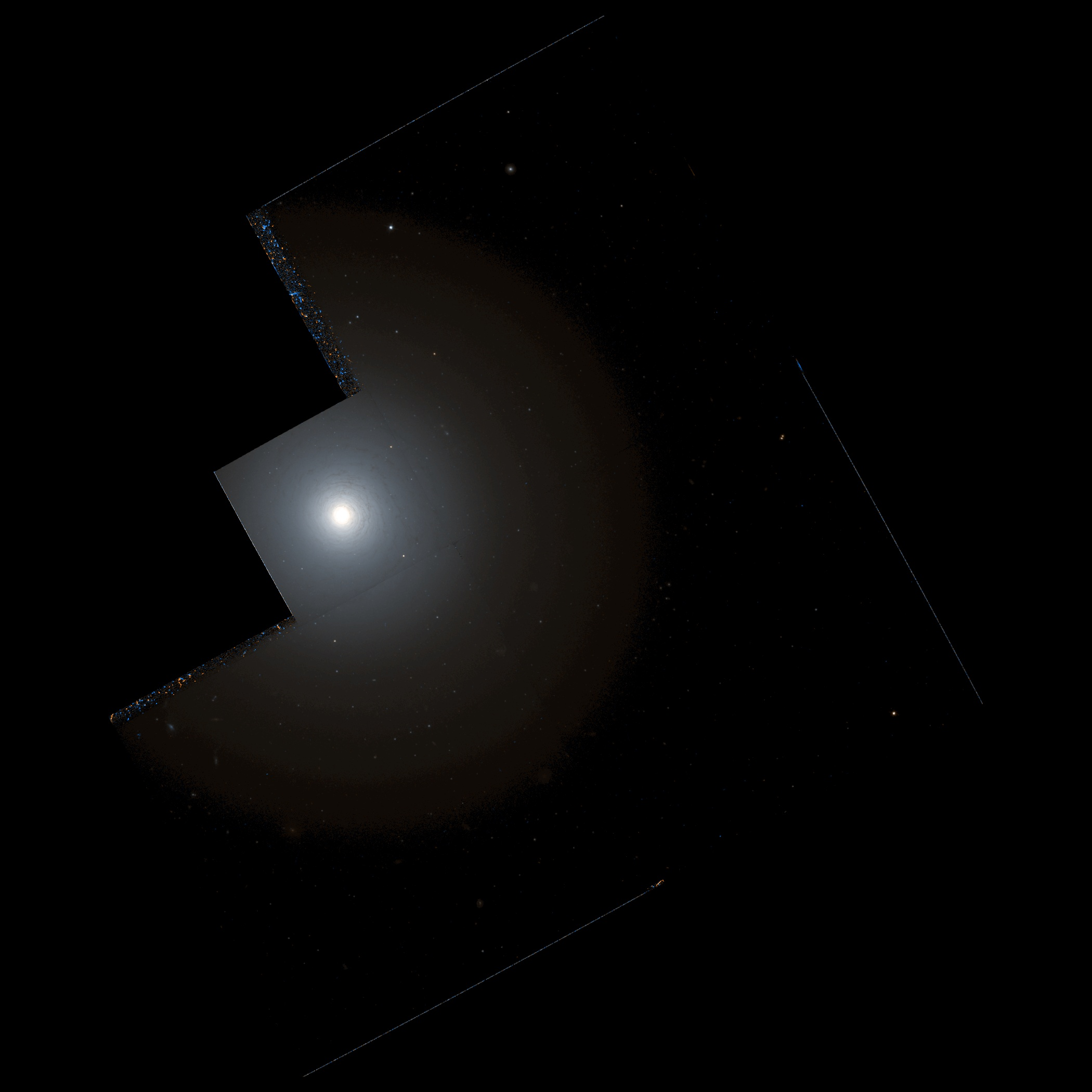
NGC 524 (HST)
