= NGC 343 =

Spiral galaxy in the constellation Cetus

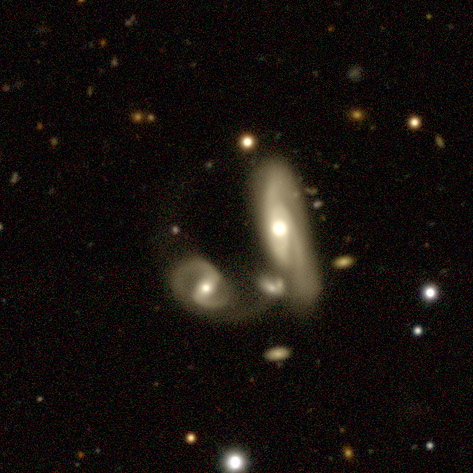
- NGC 343 with DECam. The galaxy on the left could be NGC 344. But NGC 344 was also identified as LEDA 3674 in SIMBAD

Observation data (J2000 epoch)
- Constellation: Cetus
- Right ascension: 00^{h} 58^{m} 23.9^{s}
- Declination: −23° 13′ 31″
- Redshift: 0.055288
- Heliocentric radial velocity: 16,575 km/s
- Apparent magnitude (V): 16.29

Characteristics
- Type: Sc
- Apparent size (V): 0.72' × 0.26'

Other designations
- PGC 133741.

NGC 343 are a pair of interacting galaxies in the constellation Cetus. It was discovered in 1886 by Frank Muller. It was described by Dreyer as "extremely faint, very small, irregularly round, suddenly brighter middle and nucleus (perhaps a star?)."
