= NGC 66 =

Galaxy in the constellation Cetus

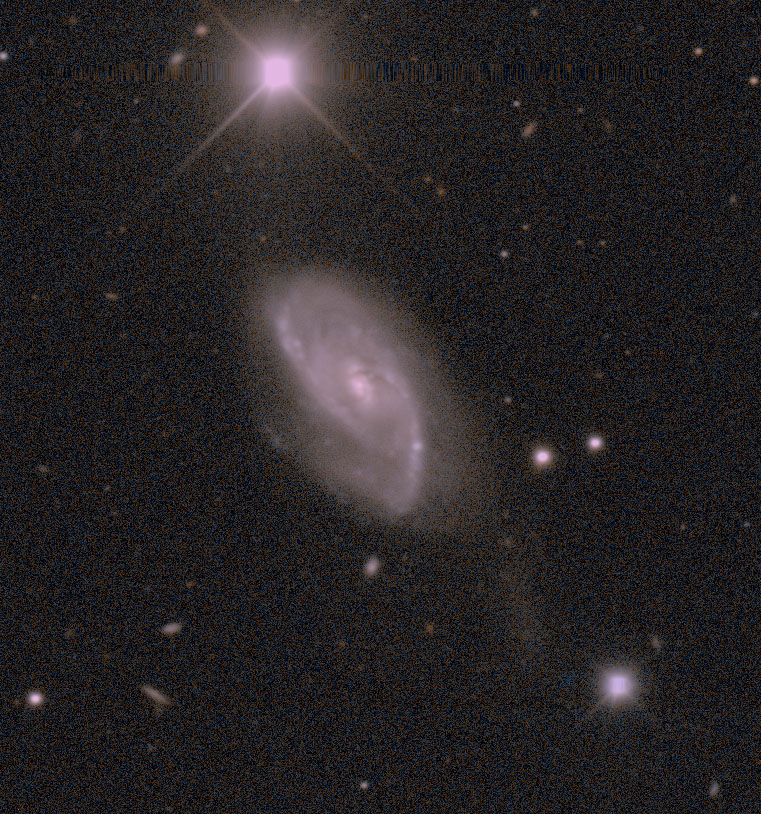
- DECam image of NGC 66

Observation data (J2000 epoch)
- Constellation: Cetus
- Right ascension: 00^{h} 19^{m} 04.94039^{s}
- Declination: −22° 56′ 10.8306″
- Redshift: 0.025368
- Heliocentric radial velocity: 7509 km/s
- Distance: 286.69 ± 0.65 Mly (87.90 ± 0.20 Mpc)
- Apparent magnitude (B): 14.21

Characteristics
- Type: SB(r)b pec

Other designations
- MCG -04-02-002, PGC 1236

NGC 66 is a barred spiral galaxy discovered by Frank Muller in 1886, and is located in the constellation Cetus.

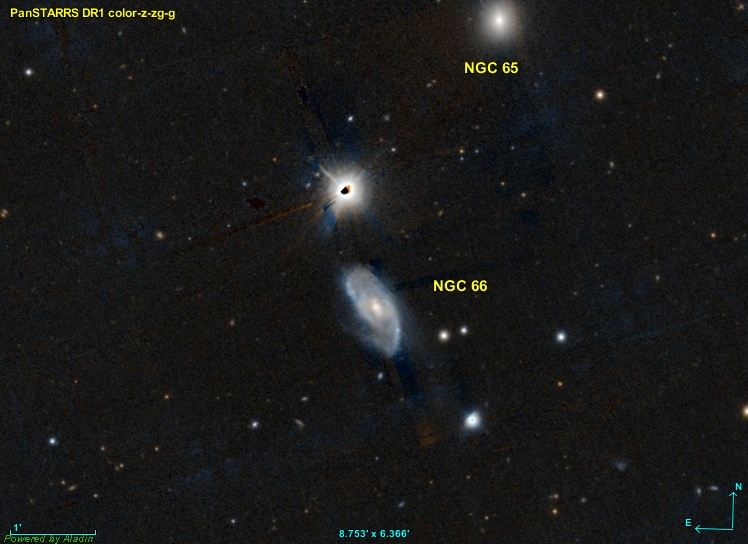
PanSTARRS view of NGC 66 and NGC 65

== See also ==
- New General Catalogue
- List of NGC objects
- List of galaxies
