= NGC 143 =

Spiral galaxy in the constellation Cetus

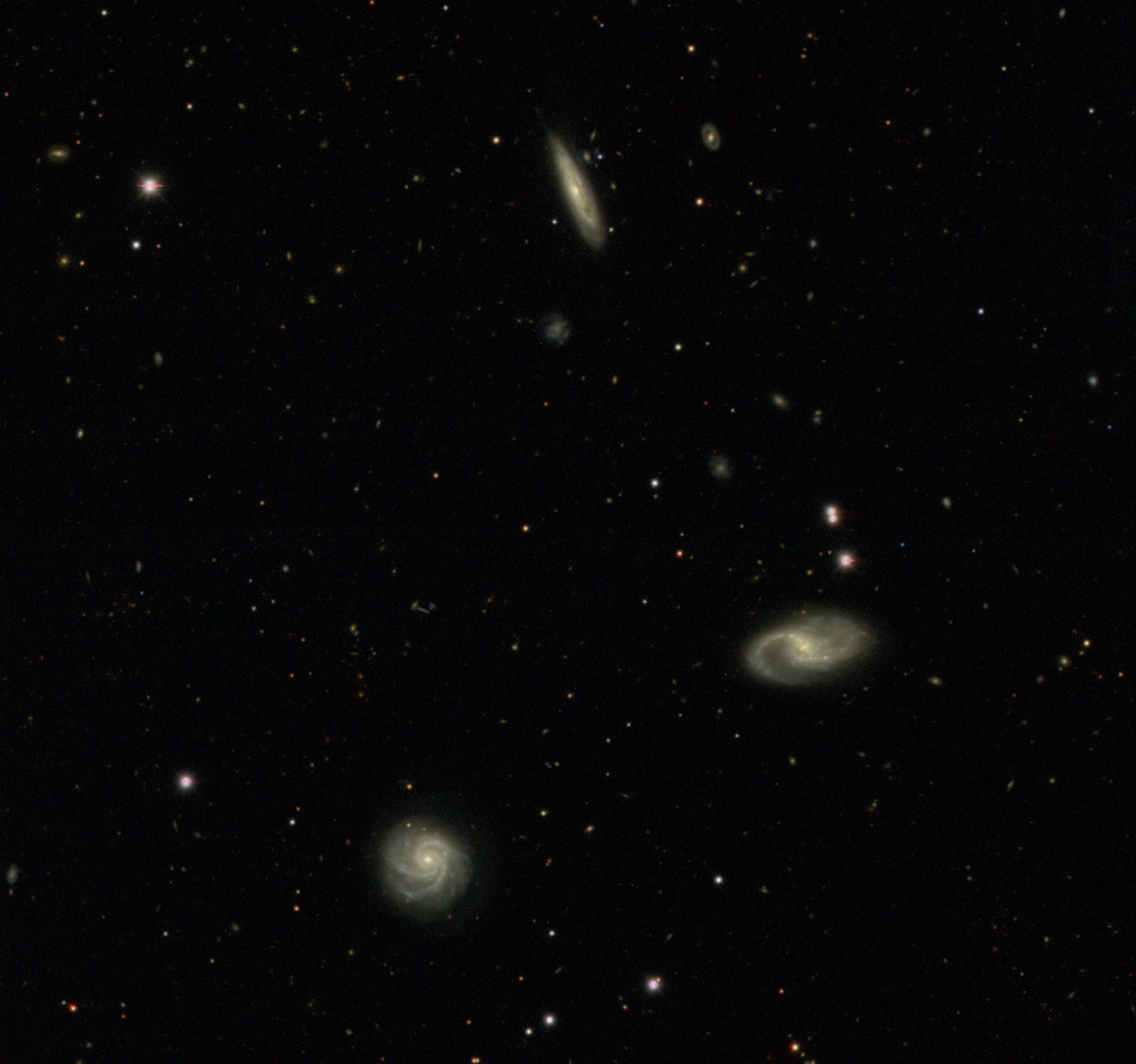
- DECam photograph of NGC 142, 143 and 144. NGC 143 is the galaxy at the top.

Observation data (J2000 epoch)
- Constellation: Cetus
- Right ascension: 00^{h} 31^{m} 15.6^{s}
- Declination: −22° 33′ 56″
- Redshift: 0.026849
- Heliocentric radial velocity: 8049 ± 10

Characteristics
- Type: SBb

Other designations
- ESO 473- G 022, MCG-04-02-015

NGC 143 is a spiral galaxy in the constellation Cetus. It was discovered by Frank Muller in 1886.
