= NGC 367 =

Spiral galaxy in the constellation Cetus

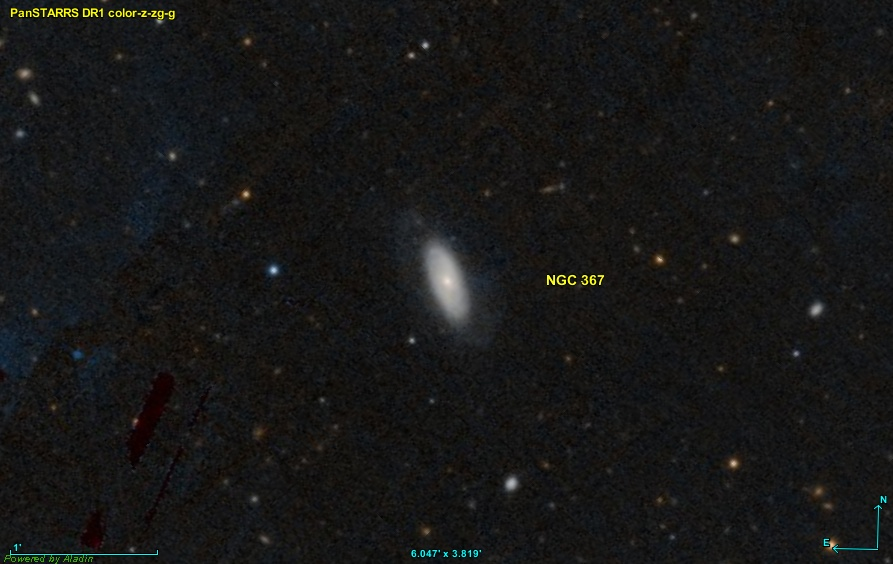
- Pan-STARRS image of NGC 367

Observation data (J2000 epoch)
- Constellation: Cetus
- Right ascension: 01^{h} 05^{m} 48.887^{s}
- Declination: −12° 07′ 42.33″
- Redshift: 0.025999
- Heliocentric radial velocity: 7,693 km/s
- Apparent magnitude (V): 14.7

Characteristics
- Type: Sa
- Apparent size (V): 0.9′ × 0.5′

Other designations
- PGC 3894

NGC 367 is a spiral galaxy in the constellation of Cetus. It was discovered in 1886 by the astronomer Frank Muller.
