= NGC 7808 =

Galaxy in the constellation Cetus

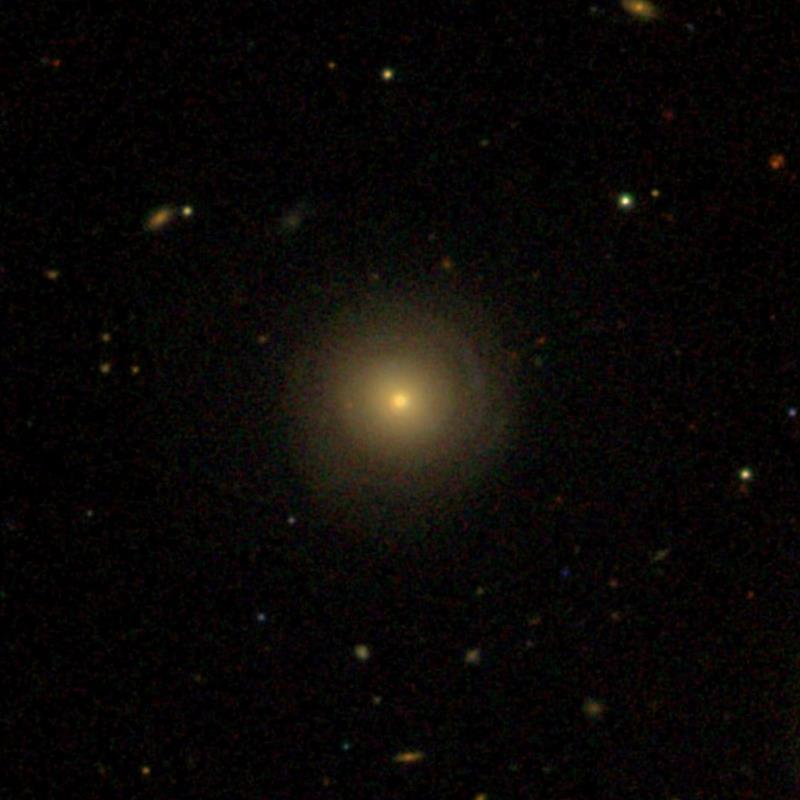
- NGC 7808 imaged by SDSS

Observation data (J2000 epoch)
- Constellation: Cetus
- Right ascension: 00^{h} 03^{m} 32.1264^{s}
- Declination: −10° 44′ 40.833″
- Redshift: 0.029570
- Heliocentric radial velocity: 8865 ± 2 km/s
- Distance: 409.9 ± 28.7 Mly (125.67 ± 8.80 Mpc)
- Apparent magnitude (V): 12.8

Characteristics
- Type: (R')SA0^0?
- Size: ~158,900 ly (48.71 kpc) (estimated)
- Apparent size (V): 1.3′ × 1.3′

Other designations
- IRAS F00009-1101, 2MASX J00033214-1044403, MCG -02-01-013, PGC 243

NGC 7808 is a lenticular galaxy in the constellation of Cetus. Its velocity with respect to the cosmic microwave background is 8521 ± 24 km/s, which corresponds to a Hubble distance of 125.67 ± 8.80 Mpc (~410 million light-years). It was discovered by American astronomer Frank Muller in 1886.

NGC 7808 is an active Seyfert I galaxy.

One supernova has been observed in NGC 7808: SN 2023qnz (Type Ia, mag. 20.14) was discovered by Pan-STARRS on 22 August 2023.

== Star-forming ring ==
NGC 7808 contains an outer star-forming ring, observed in ultraviolet rays. According to a 2019 study, the star formation is only above one solar mass per year. It is expected to decrease over time. Nevertheless, star-forming rings like in NGC 7808 still contain enigmatic features and can help astronomers to learn more about the evolutionary processes taken by these galaxies.

== See also ==
- List of NGC objects (7001–7840)
