= NGC 874 =

Spiral galaxy in the constellation Cetus

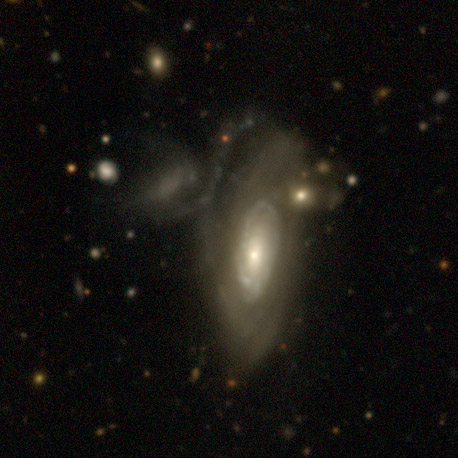
- DECam image of NGC 874

Observation data (J2000 epoch)
- Constellation: Cetus
- Right ascension: 02^{h} 16^{m} 02.06183^{s}
- Declination: −23° 18′ 21.7259″
- Heliocentric radial velocity: 12060 km/s
- Distance: 571.5 ± 40.1 Mly (175.22 ± 12.28 Mpc)

Characteristics
- Type: Sab? pec

Other designations
- ESO 478-18, GSC 06433-01732, PGC 8663

NGC 874 is a spiral galaxy located in the constellation Cetus. It is estimated to be 572 million light-years away from the Milky Way galaxy and has a diameter of approximately 80,000 light-years. NGC 874 was discovered in 1886 by Frank Muller.
