= NGC 144 =

Spiral galaxy in the constellation Cetus

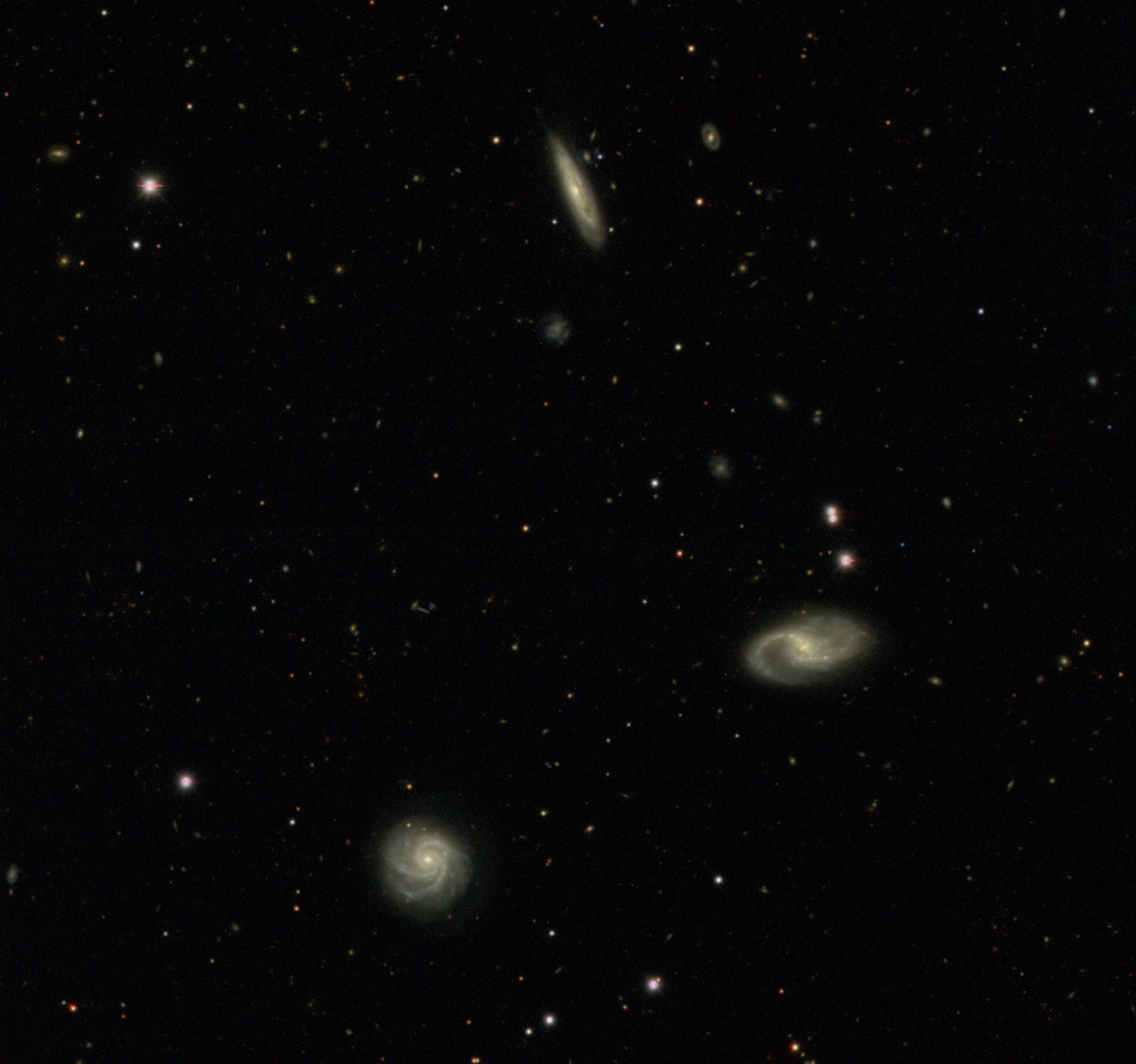
- DECam photograph of NGC 142, 143 and 144. NGC 144 is the galaxy at the bottom.

Observation data (J2000.0 epoch)
- Constellation: Cetus
- Right ascension: 00^{h} 31^{m} 20.659^{s}
- Declination: −22° 38′ 44.257″
- Redshift: 0.027132±0.000110
- Heliocentric radial velocity: 8,157±39 km/s
- Distance: 357.4 Mly (109.59 Mpc)
- Apparent magnitude (V): 13.7
- Apparent magnitude (B): 14.4

Characteristics
- Type: Sc: pec
- Apparent size (V): 0.78′ × 0.73′

Other designations
- ESO 473-G 023, NGC 144, MCG -04-02-016, PGC 1917

NGC 144 is a spiral galaxy in the equatorial constellation of Cetus (the Whale). It was discovered in 1886 by American astronomer Frank Muller. This galaxy has an apparent visual magnitude of 13.7 and spans an angular size of 0.78′ × 0.73′. It is located at a distance of 357.4 million light-years (109.59 Mpc) from the Milky Way and is receding with a line of sight velocity component of 8,157 km/s.
