= NGC 168 =

Lenticular galaxy in the constellation Cetus

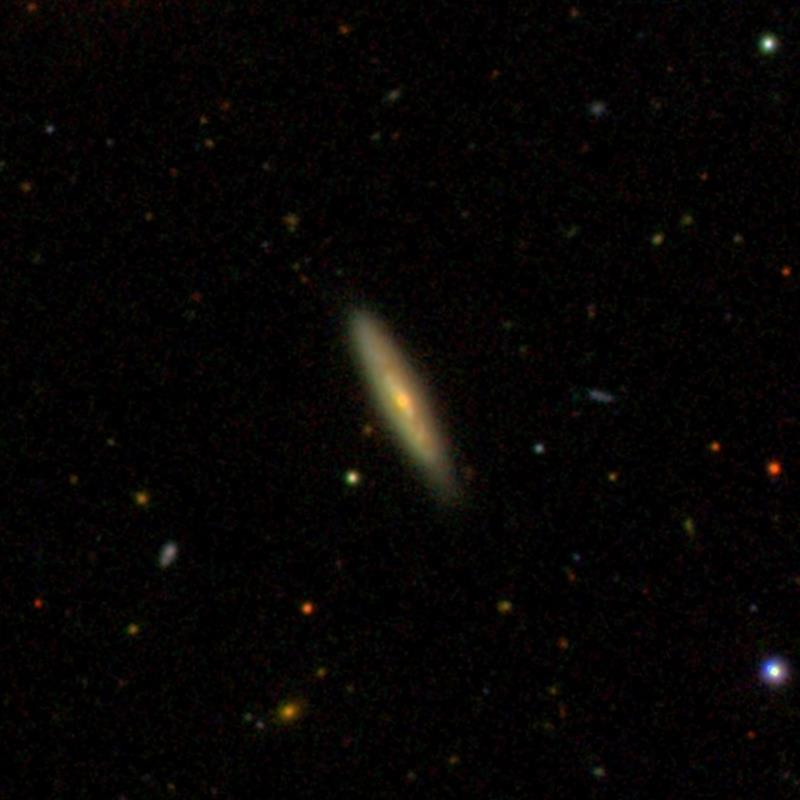
- SDSS image of NGC 168

Observation data (J2000 epoch)
- Constellation: Cetus
- Right ascension: 00^{h} 36^{m} 38.6^{s}
- Declination: −22° 35′ 37″
- Redshift: 0.012980
- Apparent magnitude (V): 14.87

Characteristics
- Type: S0/a
- Apparent size (V): 1.2' × 0.2'

Other designations
- PGC 2192.

NGC 168 is a lenticular galaxy located in the constellation Cetus. It was discovered in 1886 by Frank Muller.
