= NGC 77 =

Galaxy in the constellation Cetus

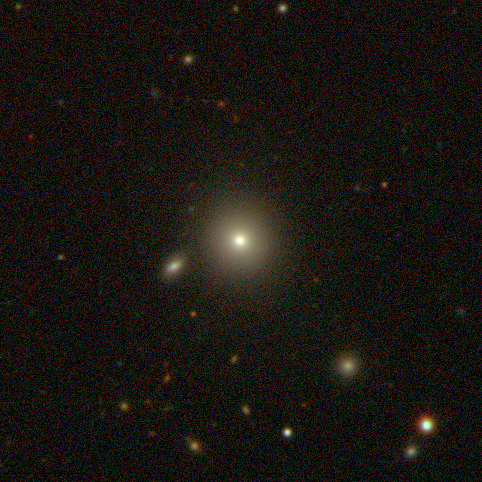
- DECam image of NGC 77

Observation data (J2000 epoch)
- Constellation: Cetus
- Right ascension: 00^{h} 07^{m} 15.84^{s}
- Declination: +27° 42′ 29.1″
- Redshift: 0.063064
- Heliocentric radial velocity: 18906 ± 1 km/s
- Apparent magnitude (V): 14.8

Characteristics
- Type: IBmP

Other designations
- PGC 1290

NGC 77 (also known as PGC 1290, NPM1G -22.0006 or PGC 198147) is a lenticular galaxy located 780 million light-years away in the constellation of Cetus. It was discovered by Frank Muller in 1886. Its apparent magnitude is 14.8, and it is around 360,000 light-years across.
