= NGC 276 =

Galaxy located in the constellation Cetus

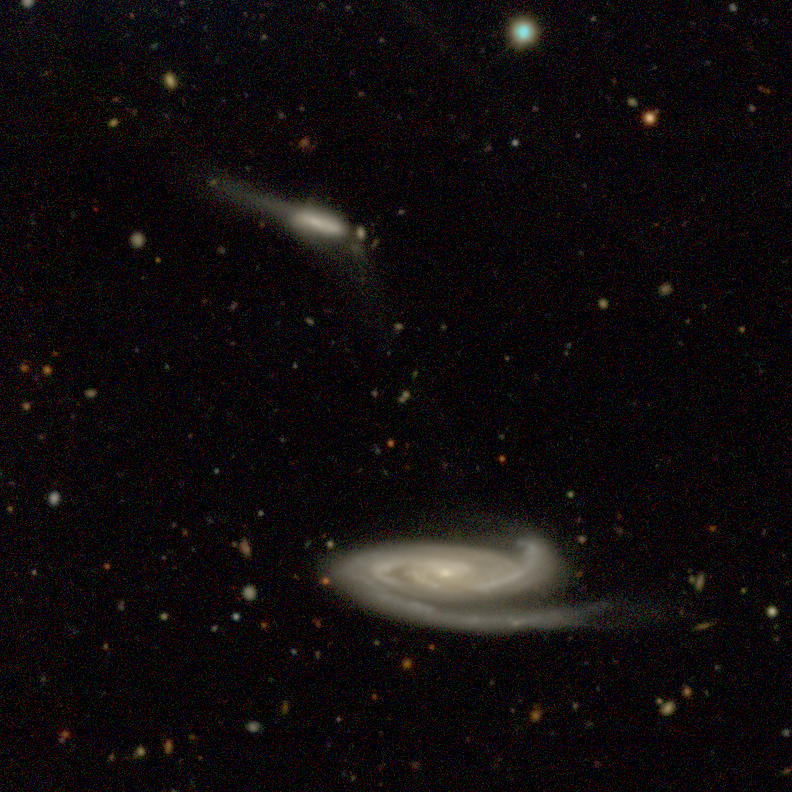
- NGC 276 as seen by DECam. The galaxy at the top is KOSS 004941.1-225538

Observation data (J2000 epoch)
- Constellation: Cetus
- Right ascension: 00^{h} 52^{m} 06.6^{s}
- Declination: −22° 40′ 49″
- Redshift: 0.046826
- Heliocentric radial velocity: 14,038 km/s
- Distance: 626 Mly
- Apparent magnitude (V): 15.68

Characteristics
- Type: SB
- Apparent size (V): 1.0' × 0.4'

Other designations
- ESO 474- G 034, IC 1591, MCG -04-03-021, 2MASX J00520656-2240486, IRAS 00496-2257, ESO-LV 4740340, 6dF J0052065-224049, PGC 3054.

NGC 276 is a barred spiral galaxy located approximately 626 million light-years from the Solar System in the constellation Cetus. It was discovered in 1886 by Frank Muller and was later also observed by DeLisle Stewart.

John Dreyer, creator of the New General Catalogue describes the object as "extremely faint, pretty small, extended 265°, 11 magnitude star 3 arcmin to north". The galaxy's right ascension was later corrected in the Index Catalogue using the observation data by Stewart.

== See also ==
- List of NGC objects (1–1000)
- Pisces (constellation)
