= NGC 177 =

Galaxy in the constellation Cetus

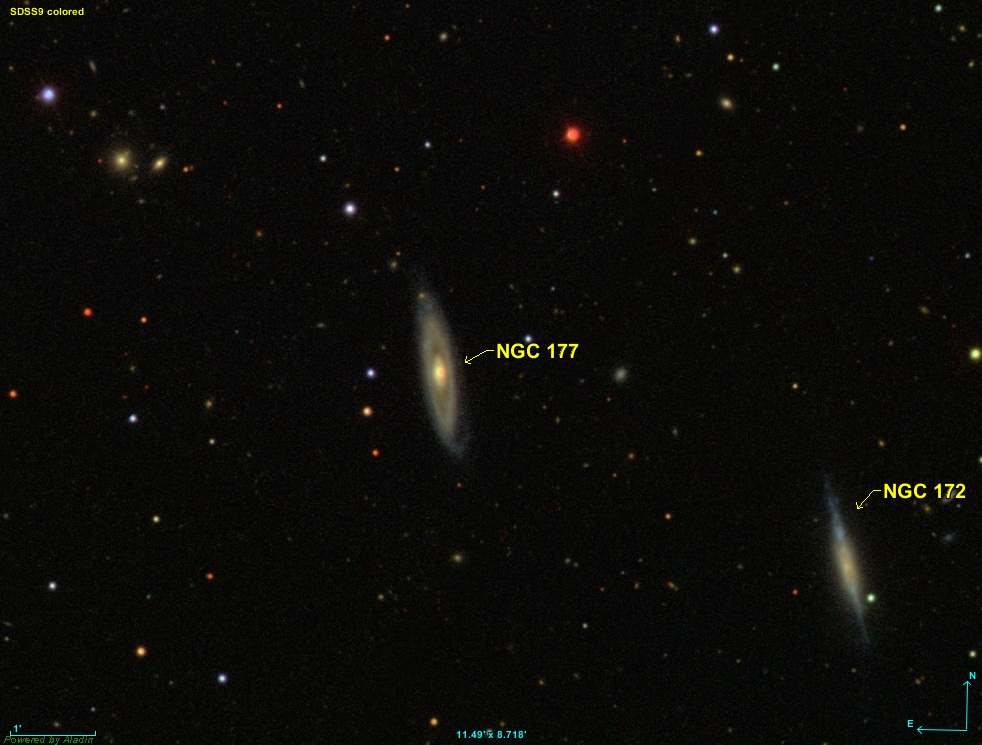
- NGC 177 as seen in the Pan-STARRS 1 Sky Survey.

Observation data (J2000 epoch)
- Constellation: Cetus
- Right ascension: 00^{h} 37^{m} 34.3^{s}
- Declination: −22° 32′ 57″
- Redshift: 0.012792
- Distance: 197.73 ± 10.57 Mly (60.625 ± 3.240 Mpc)
- Apparent magnitude (V): 14.10

Characteristics
- Type: SA(r)ab
- Apparent size (V): 2.2' × 0.5'

Other designations
- ESO 474- G 006, MCG -04-02-028, 2MASX J00373433-2232573, 2MASXi J0037343-223257, ESO-LV 4740060, PGC 2241.

NGC 177 is an unbarred spiral galaxy with a distinct ring structure, located around 200 million light-years away in the constellation Cetus. It was discovered in 1886 by Frank Muller.
