= NGC 301 =

Galaxy located in the constellation Cetus

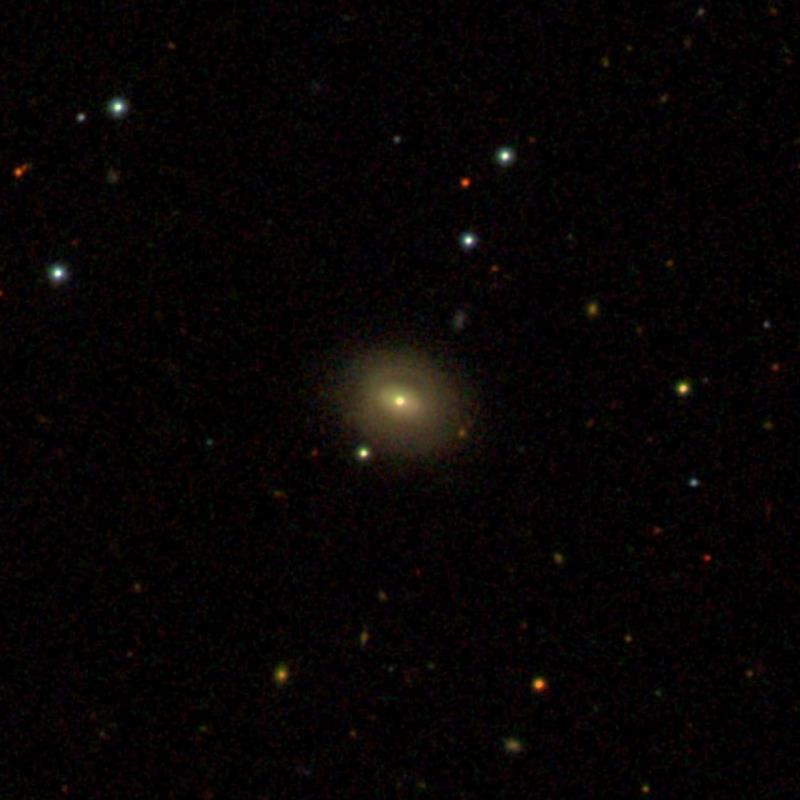
- SDSS view of NGC 301

Observation data (J2000 epoch)
- Constellation: Cetus
- Right ascension: 00^{h} 56^{m} 18.3^{s}
- Declination: −10° 40′ 26″
- Redshift: 0.022667
- Heliocentric radial velocity: 6,795 km/s
- Distance: 304 Mly
- Apparent magnitude (V): 15.1

Characteristics
- Type: Sa
- Apparent size (V): 0.69' × 0.58'

Other designations
- 2MASX J00561836-1040258, 6dF J0056183-104026, PGC 3345.

NGC 301 is a spiral galaxy located approximately 204 million light-years from the Solar System in the constellation Cetus. It was discovered in 1886 by Frank Muller.

== See also ==
- List of NGC objects (1–1000)
