= NGC 555 =

Galaxy in the constellation Cetus

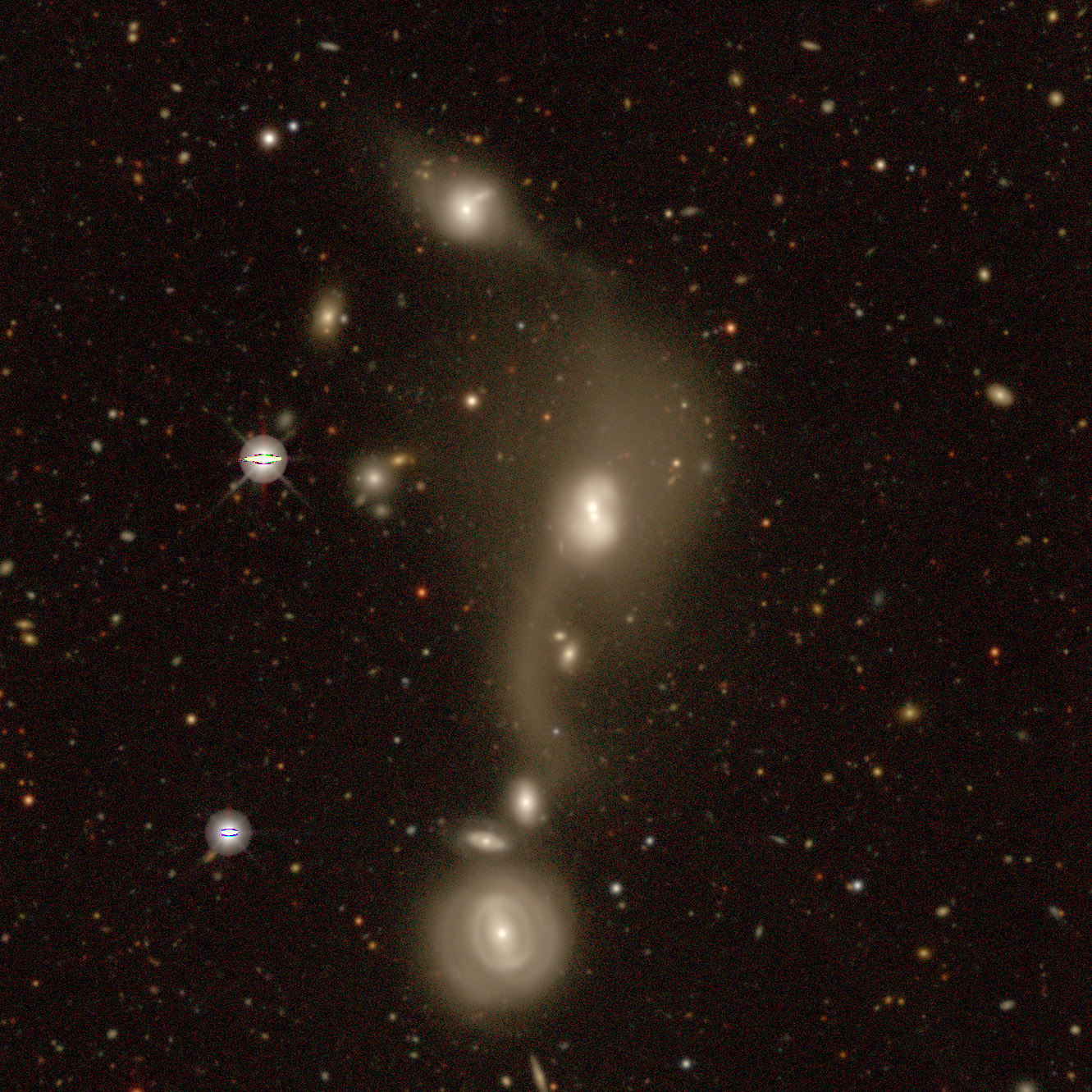
- NGC 555 (bottom) captured by Legacy Surveys DR10 next to NGC 554 and NGC 556

Observation data (J2000 epoch)
- Constellation: Cetus
- Right ascension: 01^{h} 27^{m} 11.80^{s}
- Declination: −22° 45′ 43.00″
- Redshift: 0.034137 ± 1.50
- Distance: 479 Mly (147.04 Mpc)
- Apparent magnitude (V): 14.4

Characteristics
- Type: G
- Size: 173,000 ly
- Apparent size (V): 0.759′ × 0.676′
- Notable features: Maybe evolving into a ring galaxy(?)

Other designations
- ESO 476-12, PGC 5419, 2MASX J01271185-2245439, GSC 06426-00050, MCG-04-04-014, ESO-LV 476-0120, SGC 012448-2301.3, 6dFGS gJ012711.8-224544, NPM1G -23.0003, LEDA 5419, APMBGC 476+036-111, Gaia DR2 5042200315975022592

NGC 555 is a lenticular galaxy located around 479 million light-years away in the constellation Cetus. NGC 555 was discovered in 1886 by the American astronomer Frank Muller. NGC 555 is not known to have much star formation, and it is not known to have an active galactic nucleus.
