= NGC 172 =

Barred spiral galaxy in the constellation Cetus

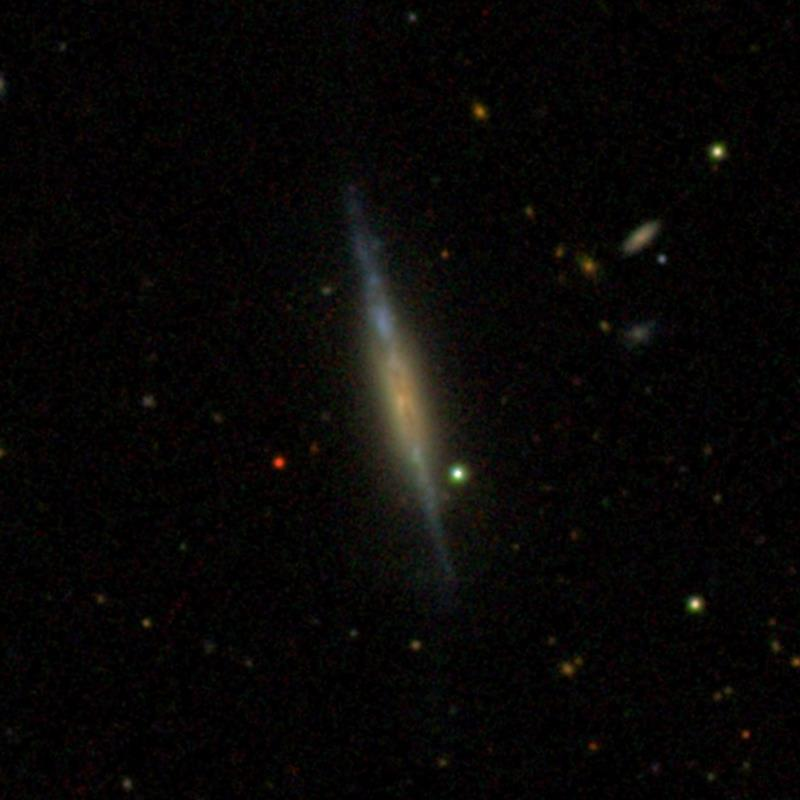
- NGC 172 as seen on SDSS

Observation data (J2000 epoch)
- Constellation: Cetus
- Right ascension: 00^{h} 37^{m} 13.6^{s}
- Declination: −22° 35′ 13″
- Redshift: 0.010164
- Distance: 136 Mly
- Apparent magnitude (V): 15.09

Characteristics
- Type: SB(r)bc?
- Apparent size (V): 2.0' × 0.3'

Other designations
- ESO 474- G 005, MCG -04-02-027, 2MASX J00371359-2235132, 2MASXi J0037135-223513, IRAS 00348-2251, IRAS F00347-2012, ESO-LV 4740050, 6dF J0037136-223513, PGC 2228.

NGC 172 is a barred spiral galaxy located around 136 million light-years away in the constellation Cetus. It was discovered in 1886 by astronomer Frank Muller. The galaxy has an edge-on orientation when viewed from Earth.

== See also ==
- List of NGC objects (1–1000)
