= NGC 344 =

Galaxy in the constellation Cetus

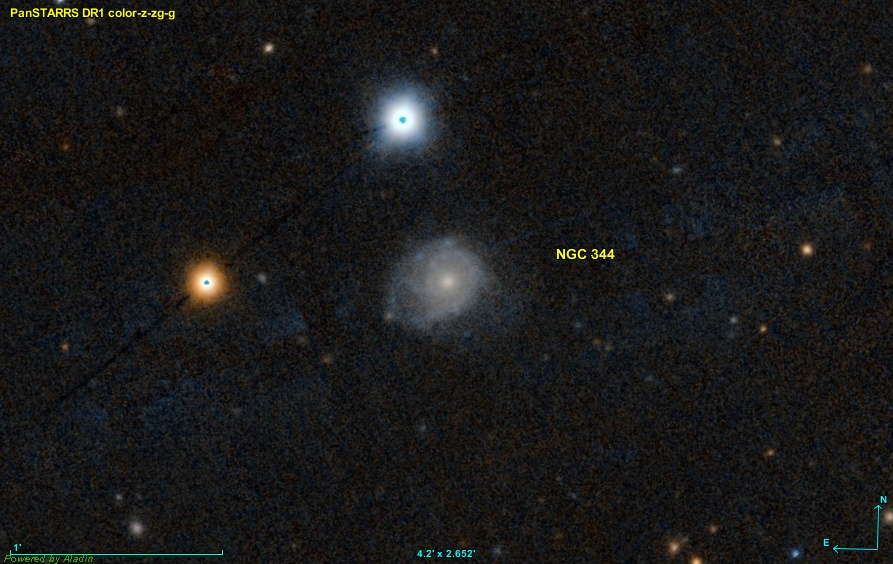

Observation data (J2000 epoch)
- Constellation: Cetus
- Right ascension: 00^{h} 58^{m} 24.0^{s}
- Declination: −23° 13′ 30″
- Redshift: 0.055992
- Heliocentric radial velocity: 16,785 km/s
- Apparent magnitude (V): 17.75

Characteristics
- Type: S
- Apparent size (V): 0.35' × 0.2'

Other designations
- 2MASX J00582406-2313296, 2MASXi J0058240-231329, 2MASXi J0058254-231344, (probably) PGC 198261, PGC 803236.

NGC 344 is a barred spiral galaxy in the constellation Cetus. It was discovered in 1886 by Frank Muller. It was described by John Louis Emil Dreyer as "extremely faint, very small, irregularly round, suddenly brighter middle and nucleus (perhaps a star?)."
