= NGC 17 =

Spiral galaxy in the constellation Cetus

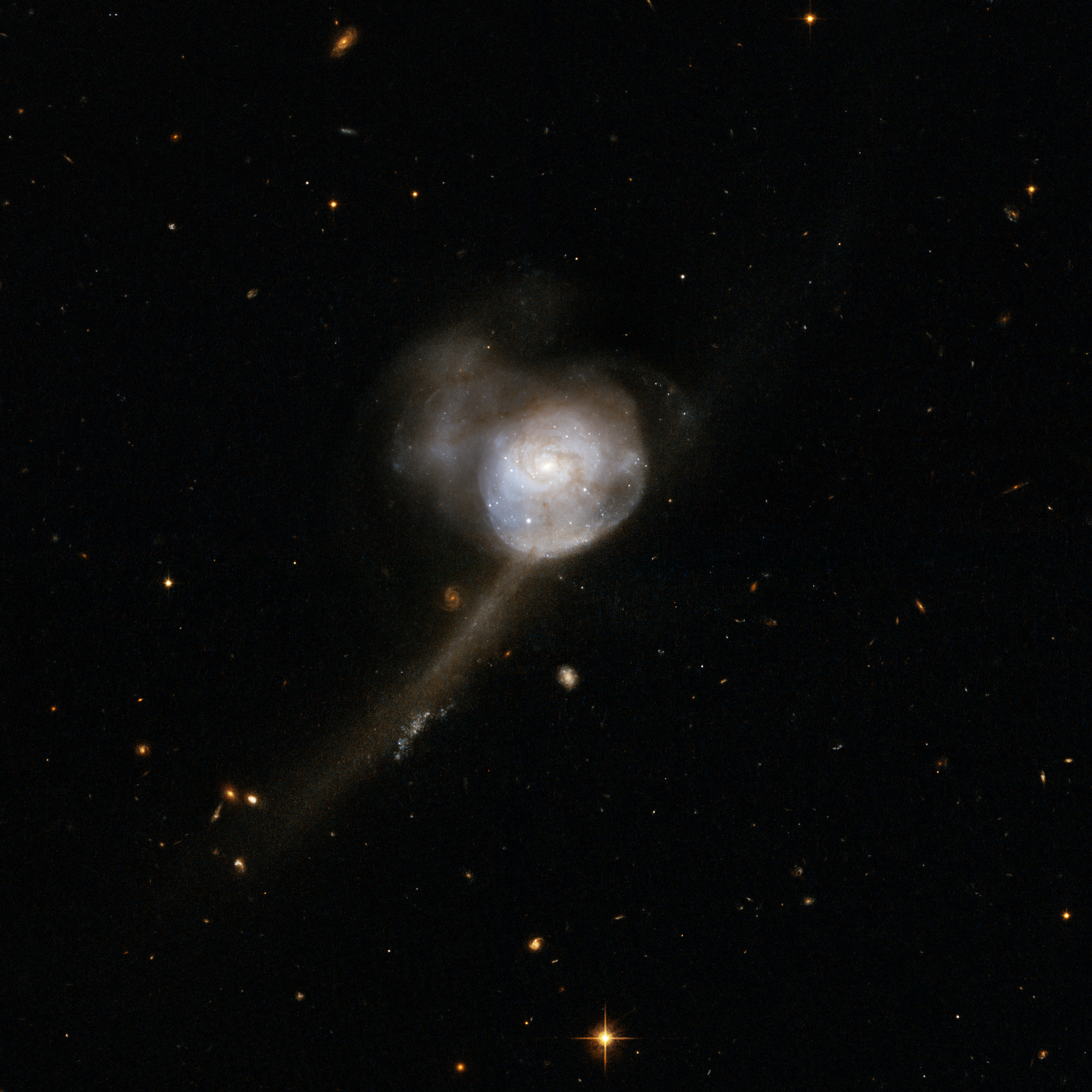
- NGC 17 as seen by the Hubble Space Telescope

Observation data (J2000 epoch)
- Constellation: Cetus
- Right ascension: 00^{h} 11^{m} 06.5^{s}
- Declination: −12° 06′ 26″
- Redshift: 0.019617
- Heliocentric radial velocity: 5,881 ± 2 km/s
- Apparent magnitude (V): 15.3

Characteristics
- Type: Sc
- Apparent size (V): 2.2′ × 0.8′

Other designations
- NGC 34, Mrk 938, VV 850, PGC 781

NGC 17, also known as NGC 34, is a spiral galaxy in the constellation Cetus. It is the result of a merger between two disk galaxies, resulting in a recent starburst in the central regions and continuing starforming activity. The galaxy is still gas-rich, and has a single galactic nucleus. It lies 250 million light years away. It was discovered in 1886 by Frank Muller and then observed again later that year by Lewis Swift.

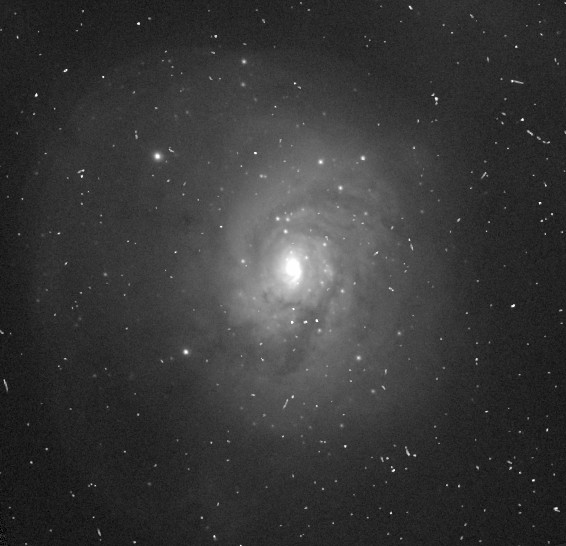
The central regions of NGC 17 have a spiral structure.

Due to the major merger event NGC 17 has no defined spiral arms like the Milky Way galaxy. Unlike the Milky Way, the center bar nucleus is also distorted. The merger destroyed any galactic habitable zone that may have been there before the merger. For the Milky Way, the galactic habitable zone is commonly believed to be an annulus with an outer radius of about 10 kiloparsecs and an inner radius close to the Galactic Center, both of which lack hard boundaries.

== Number in the New General Catalogue ==
NGC 17 and NGC 34 were catalogued by Frank Muller and Lewis Swift, respectively, in 1886. A difference of half a degree in positioning between the two men's observations meant that when John Dreyer created the New General Catalogue he listed them as separate objects. In 1900 Herbert Howe noticed the discrepancy; Dreyer included the update in the second edition of the NGC in 1910.

== See also ==
- NGC
- List of NGC objects (1–1000)
- List of NGC objects
- Galaxy
