= NGC 65 =

Spiral galaxy in the constellation Cetus

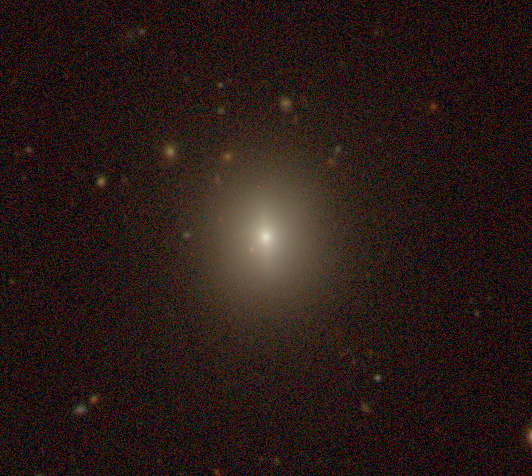
- DECam image of NGC 65

Observation data (J2000 epoch)
- Constellation: Cetus
- Right ascension: 00^{h} 18^{m} 58.71^{s}
- Declination: −22° 52′ 49.3″
- Redshift: 0.024494
- Heliocentric radial velocity: 7253 km/s
- Distance: 336.0 ± 23.6 Mly (103.03 ± 7.25 Mpc)
- Apparent magnitude (B): 14.65

Characteristics
- Type: SAB(rs)0^{−}:

Other designations
- MCG -04-02-001, PGC 1229

NGC 65 (ESO 473-10A/PGC 1229) is a lenticular galaxy in the constellation Cetus. Its apparent magnitude is 13.4. It was first discovered in 1886, and is also known as PGC 1229.

== See also ==
- List of NGC objects
- List of galaxies
- New General Catalogue
