= Frank Muller (astronomer) =

American astronomer (1862–1917)

Frank Muller (September 10, 1862 – April 19, 1917) was an American astronomer. From 1885, he worked in the Leander McCormick Observatory as an assistant to Ormond Stone and Francis Preserved Leavenworth. He discovered ~100 astronomical objects, from NGC catalog and Index catalog, for example NGC 17 in 1886.
