= NGC 125 =

Lenticular galaxy in the constellation Pisces

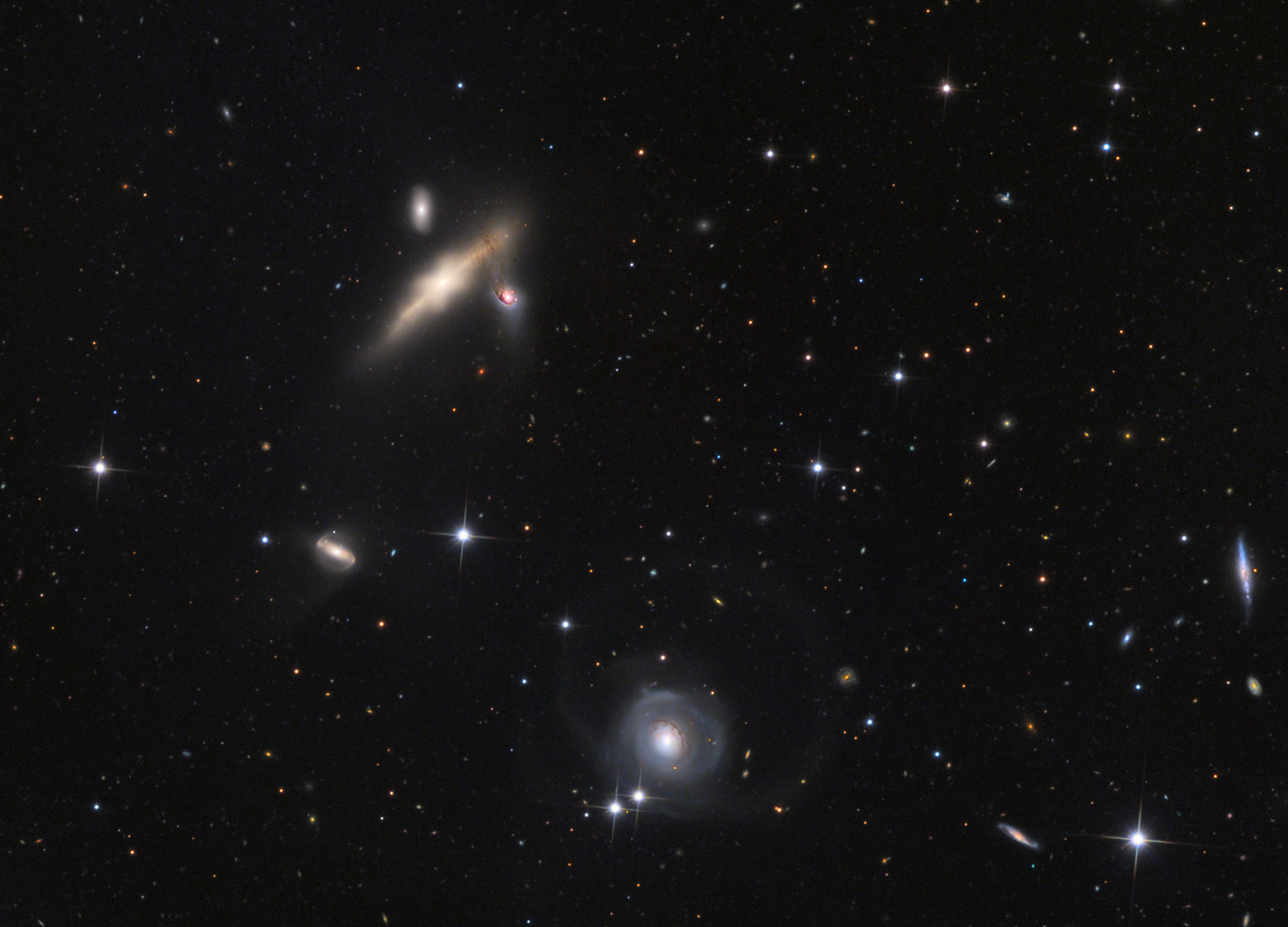
- NGC 125 is on the bottom in this image taken on Mount Lemmon Sky Center

Observation data (J2000 epoch)
- Constellation: Pisces
- Right ascension: 00^{h} 28^{m} 50.206^{s}
- Declination: +02° 50′ 20.06″
- Redshift: 0.017722
- Heliocentric radial velocity: 5266 km/s
- Apparent magnitude (V): 12.9

Characteristics
- Type: (R)SA0+P
- Apparent size (V): 1.70′ x 1.5′

Other designations
- PGC 1772, UGC 286

NGC 125 (also known as PGC 1772) is a lenticular galaxy located in the constellation Pisces. It is designated as subclass Sa Ring in the galaxy morphological classification scheme. It lies approximately 235 million light-years away.

NGC 125 was discovered by astronomer William Herschel on 25 December 1790 and viewed with a reflecting telescope with an aperture of 18.7 inches. At the time of discovery, its coordinates were recorded as 00h 21m 41s, +87° 56.1′ -20.0″. It was also observed 12 October 1827 by John Herschel. Dreyer described NGC 125 as "very faint" and "small", with a "brighter middle". It is about 115 thousand light-years across, making it slightly larger than the Milky Way galaxy.

== Galaxy group information ==
NGC 125 is part of the NGC 128 group, which includes NGC 125, NGC 126, NGC 127, NGC 128, and NGC 130. Though they are in the same galaxy group, the >1000 km/h difference in recessional velocities between NGC 125 and NGC 128 make it unlikely that they are near in space to each other; however, because of their similar redshifts, NGC 125 and NGC 126 are most likely close.

== See also ==
- List of NGC objects (1-1000)
- List of NGC objects
