= NGC 131 =

Galaxy in the constellation of Sculptor

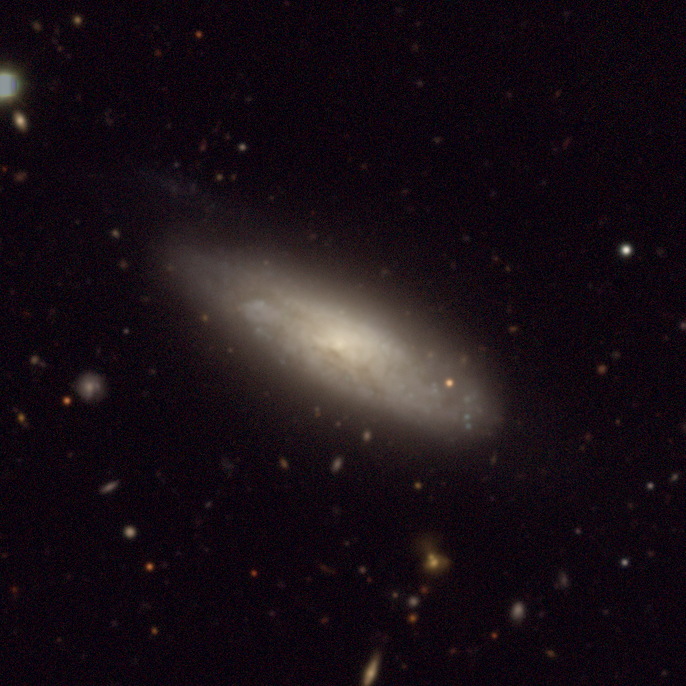
- DECam image of NGC 131

Observation data (J2000 epoch)
- Constellation: Sculptor
- Right ascension: 00^{h} 29^{m} 38.5^{s}
- Declination: −33° 15′ 35″
- Redshift: 0.004703
- Heliocentric radial velocity: 1410 km/s
- Apparent magnitude (V): 13.78

Characteristics
- Type: SB(s)b

Other designations
- PGC 1813 and 199360

NGC 131 is a spiral galaxy that was discovered on September 25, 1834, by John Herschel. This galaxy belongs in the NGC 134 group of galaxies (also known as LGG 7: NGC 115, NGC 134, NGC 148, NGC 150, PGC 2000 (often confused with IC 1554), IC 1555, ESO 410-18 and PGC 2044.

== Appearance ==
John Herschel described the galaxy as "faint, pretty large, pretty much extended, very gradually brighter middle."

== See also ==
- New General Catalogue
- NGC 134
- NGC 130
