= NGC 115 =

Galaxy in the constellation of Sculptor

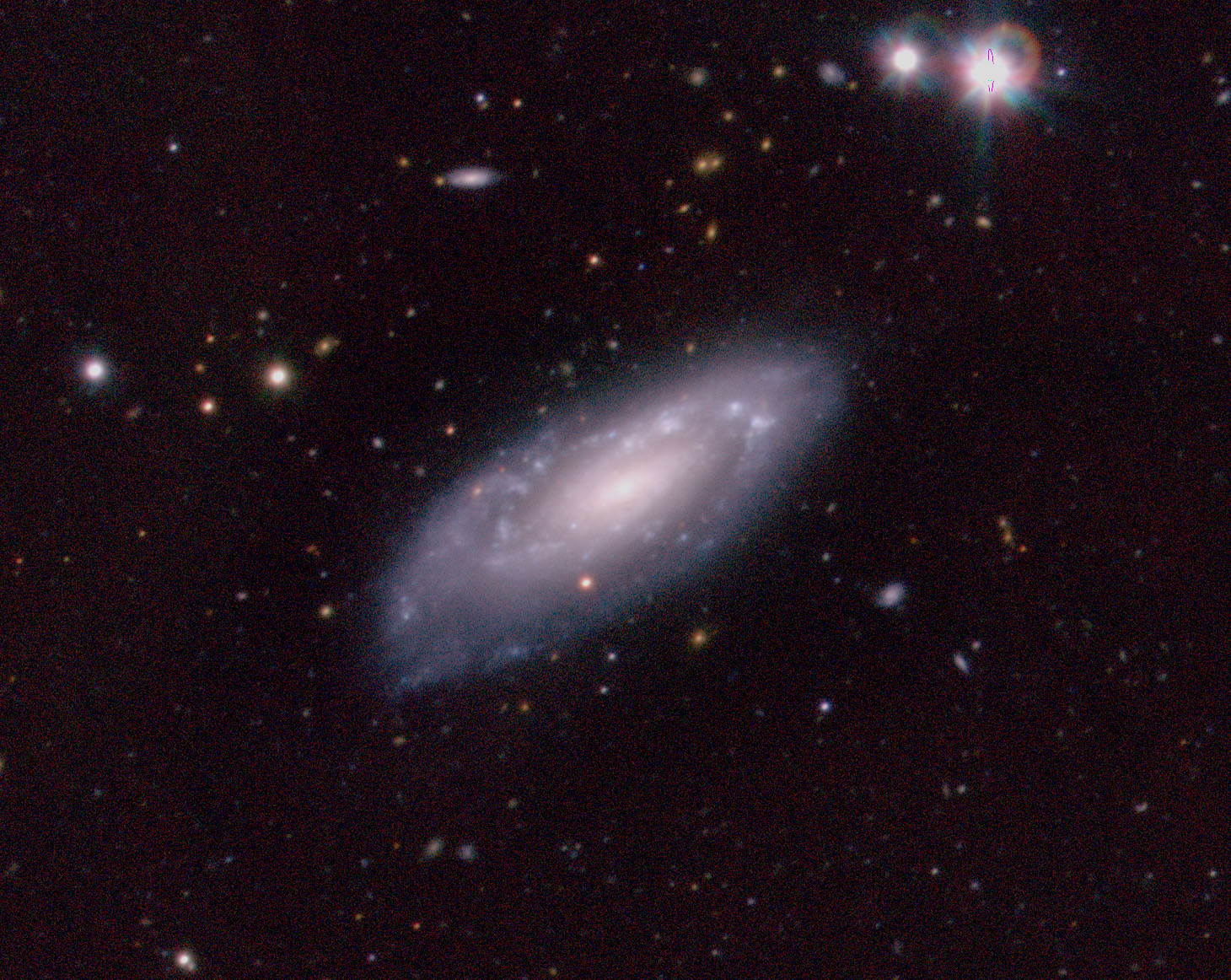
- ESO KIDS image of NGC 115

Observation data (J2000 epoch)
- Constellation: Sculptor
- Right ascension: 00^{h} 26^{m} 46.278^{s}
- Declination: −33° 40′ 37.56″
- Redshift: 0.006118
- Heliocentric radial velocity: 1828 km/s
- Distance: 85 Mly (26 Mpc)

Characteristics
- Type: SB(s)bc:
- Size: 50 kly (15 kpc)

Other designations
- MCG -06-02-006, PGC 1651

NGC 115 is a barred spiral galaxy located in the southern constellation of Sculptor. It was discovered by the British astronomer John Herschel on September 25, 1834. The galaxy is approximately 85 million light-years from the Sun, and is about 50,000 light-years in diameter, nearly half the size of our home galaxy, the Milky Way.

NGC 115 belongs to the galaxy group known as NGC 134 Group or LGG 7. Its members are NGC 131, IC 1554, NGC 148, IC 1555, NGC 134 and ESO 410-18.
