= NGC 128 =

Elliptical galaxy in Pisces

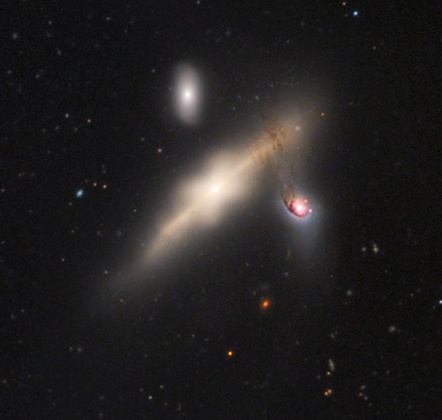
- NGC 128 with smaller galaxies NGC 130 (left) and NGC 127 (right)

Observation data (J2000 epoch)
- Constellation: Pisces
- Right ascension: 00^{h} 29^{m} 15.047^{s}
- Declination: +02° 51′ 50.60″
- Redshift: 0.01466
- Heliocentric radial velocity: 4363 km/s
- Distance: 190 Mly (58 Mpc)
- Apparent magnitude (V): 11.63
- Apparent magnitude (B): 12.65

Characteristics
- Type: S0

Other designations
- UGC 292, MCG +00-02-051, PGC 1791

NGC 128 is a lenticular galaxy in the constellation Pisces. It is approximately 190 million light-years from the Sun and has a diameter of about 165,000 light-years.

== Discovery ==
NGC 128 was discovered by astronomer William Herschel on 25 December 1790 using a reflecting telescope with an aperture of 18.7 inches. At the time of discovery, its coordinates were recorded as 00h 22m 05s, +87° 54.6′ -20.0″. It was later observed by John Herschel on 12 October 1827.

== Visual appearance ==
The galaxy is described as "pretty bright", "very small" with a "brighter middle". It is approximately 165,000 light years in diameter and is elongated. The galaxy is famous for its (peanut shell)-shaped bulge, and in 2016 it was discovered that there are two such nested structures, possibly associated with two stellar bars.

== Galaxy group information ==
NGC 128 is the largest member, and the namesake of, the NGC 128 group which also includes the galaxies NGC 127 and NGC 130. NGC 128 has a strong tidal bridge with NGC 127 and there is evidence of interaction between all three galaxies in the group. NGC 128 has a noticeable peanut shape that is likely to be caused by gravitational effects of the other two galaxies.

NGC 128 is part of a group (LGG 6) of the Lyons Groups of Galaxies catalog, which has 4 core members and 7 possible members. The 4 core members are UGC 275, UGC 283 and UGC 282.

== Supernova ==
One supernova has been observed in NGC 128: SN 2014da (Type Ia, mag. 16.2) was discovered by the Lick Observatory Supernova Search (LOSS) on 7 August 2014.

== Gallery ==
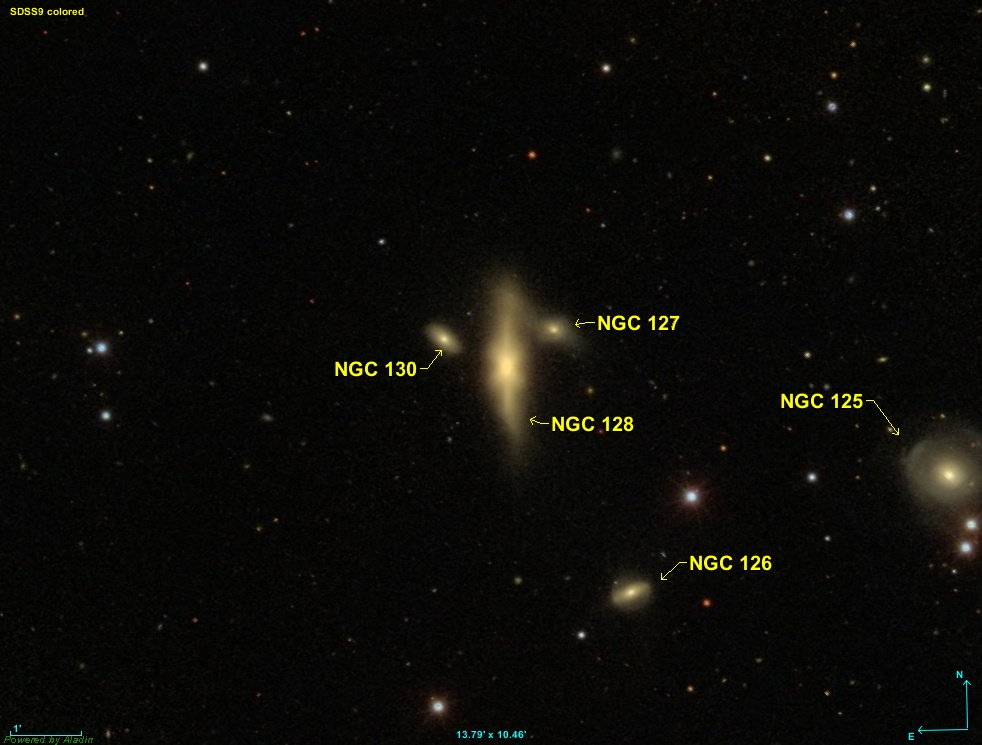
NGC 128 group with labels

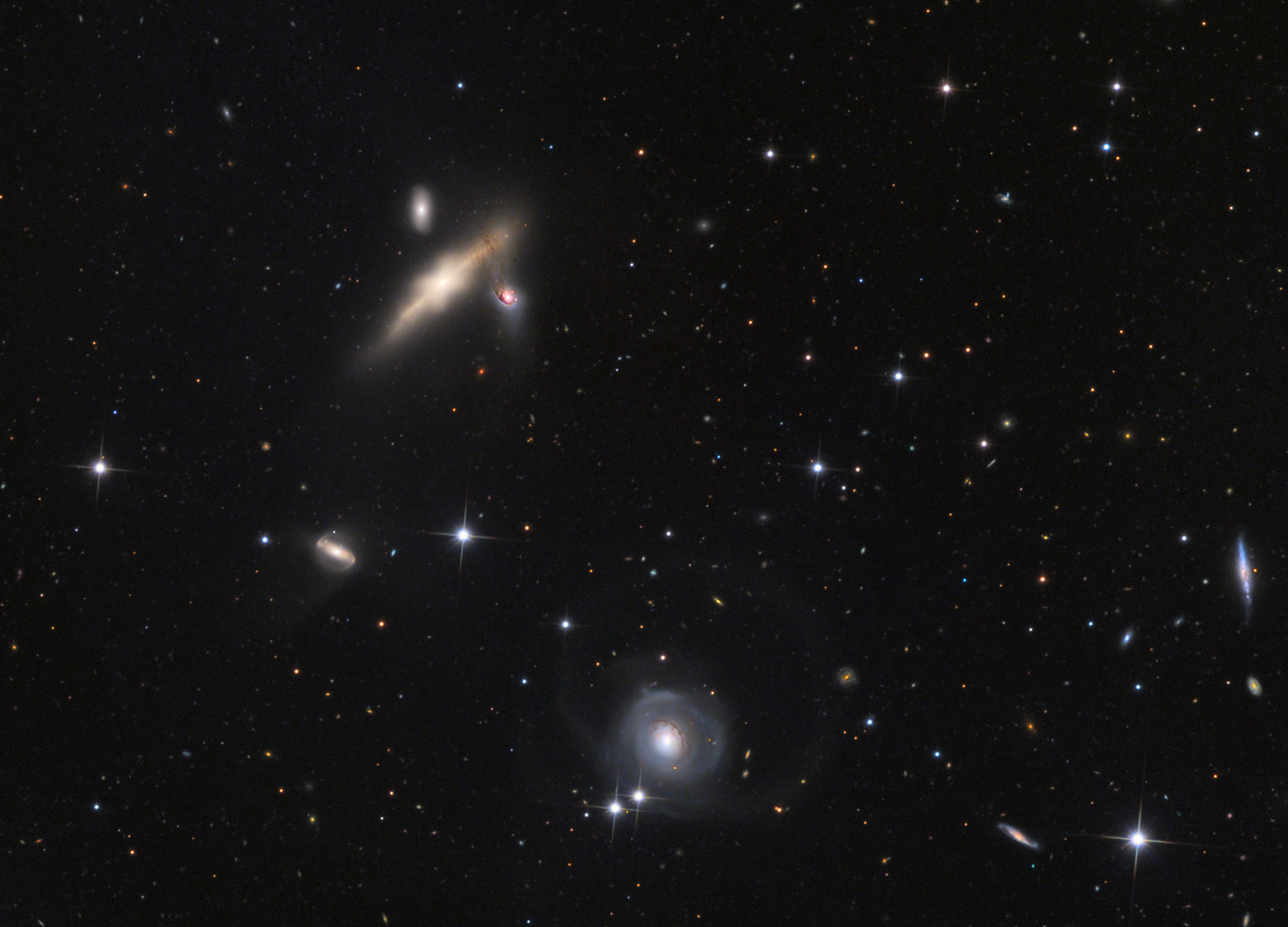
NGC 128 group without labels

== See also ==
- List of NGC objects (1–1000)
- NGC 125
- NGC 126
- NGC 127
- NGC 130
