= NGC 254 =

Galaxy in the constellation of Sculptor

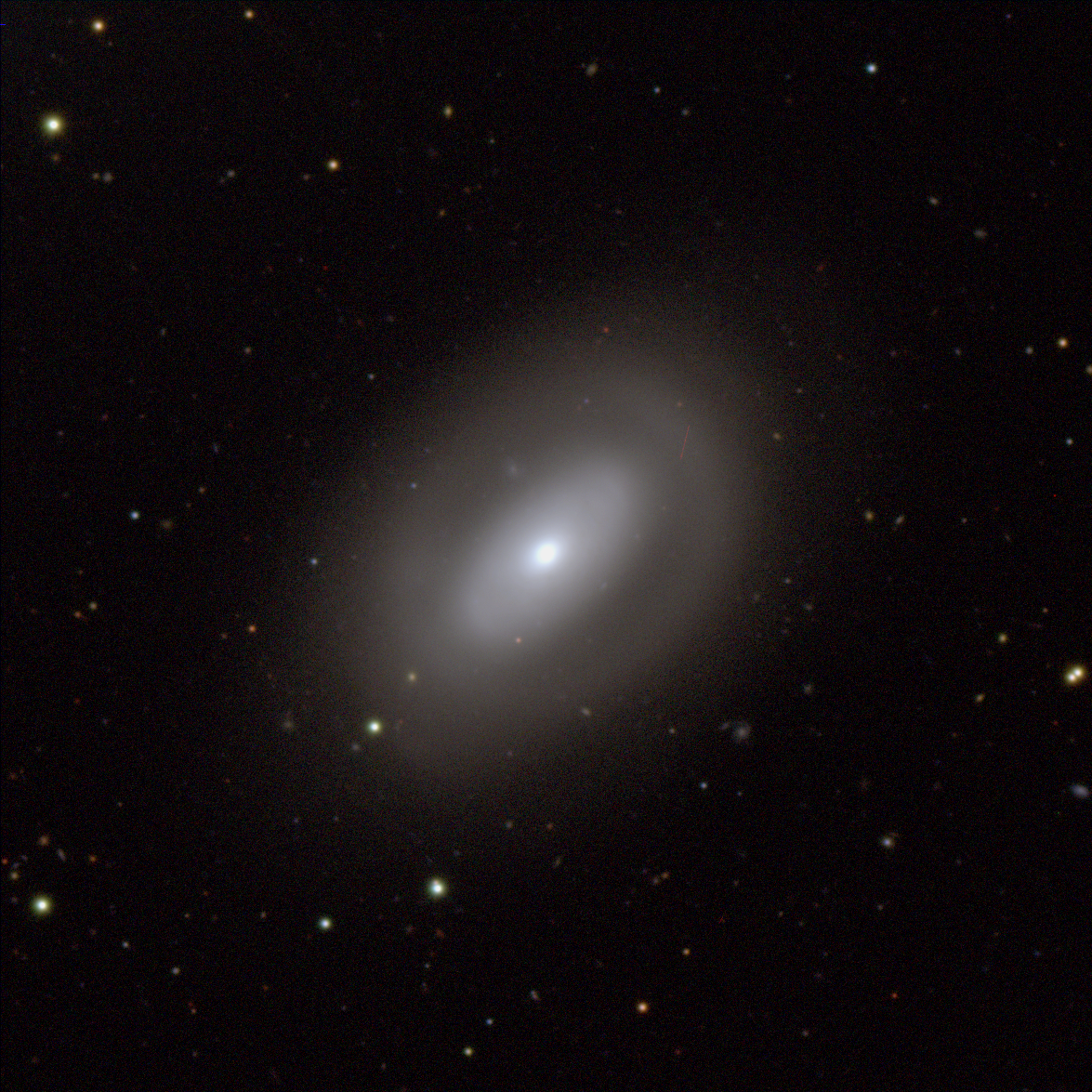
- DECam image of NGC 254

Observation data (J2000 epoch)
- Constellation: Sculptor
- Right ascension: 00^{h} 47^{m} 27.595^{s}
- Declination: −31° 25′ 18.11″
- Redshift: 0.005434
- Heliocentric radial velocity: 1629
- Distance: 55.8 Mly (17.10 Mpc)
- Apparent magnitude (V): 11.82
- Apparent magnitude (B): 11.62

Characteristics
- Type: (R)SA(rl)0^{+}
- Apparent size (V): 2.6′ × 1.7′

Other designations
- MCG-05-03-005, PGC 2778

NGC 254 is a lenticular galaxy located in the constellation Sculptor. It was discovered by John Herschel in 1834. It is in a galaxy group with NGC 134.

NGC 254 is an example of a ring galaxy, a galaxy with a ring, and in this case, no central bar. Across the entire galaxy disk, there is a disk of ionized gas rotating in the direction opposite the stellar disk's rotation. This situation may have arose when a retrograde-orbiting satellite galaxy accreted onto the galaxy itself, some 1 billion years ago.

== See also ==
- List of NGC objects
