= SN 2009gj =

2009 supernova event in the constellation Sculptor

- Event type: Supernova
- IIb
- Date: June 20, 2009
- Constellation: Sculptor
- Right ascension: 00^{h}30^{m}28^{s}.56
- Declination: -33° 12' 56".0
- Epoch: J2000.0
- Distance: 60 million light years
- Host: NGC 134
- Peak apparent magnitude: 15.9
- Other designations: SN 2009gj

SN 2009gj was a supernova located in the galaxy NGC 134, approximately 60 million light years away from Earth. It was discovered on June 20, 2009, by New Zealand amateur astronomer and dairy farmer Stuart Parker, but first reported by Christopher Stockdale and team.

== See also ==
- List of supernovae
- History of supernova observation
- List of supernova remnants
- List of supernova candidates
