= NGC 134 =

Spiral galaxy in the constellation Sculptor

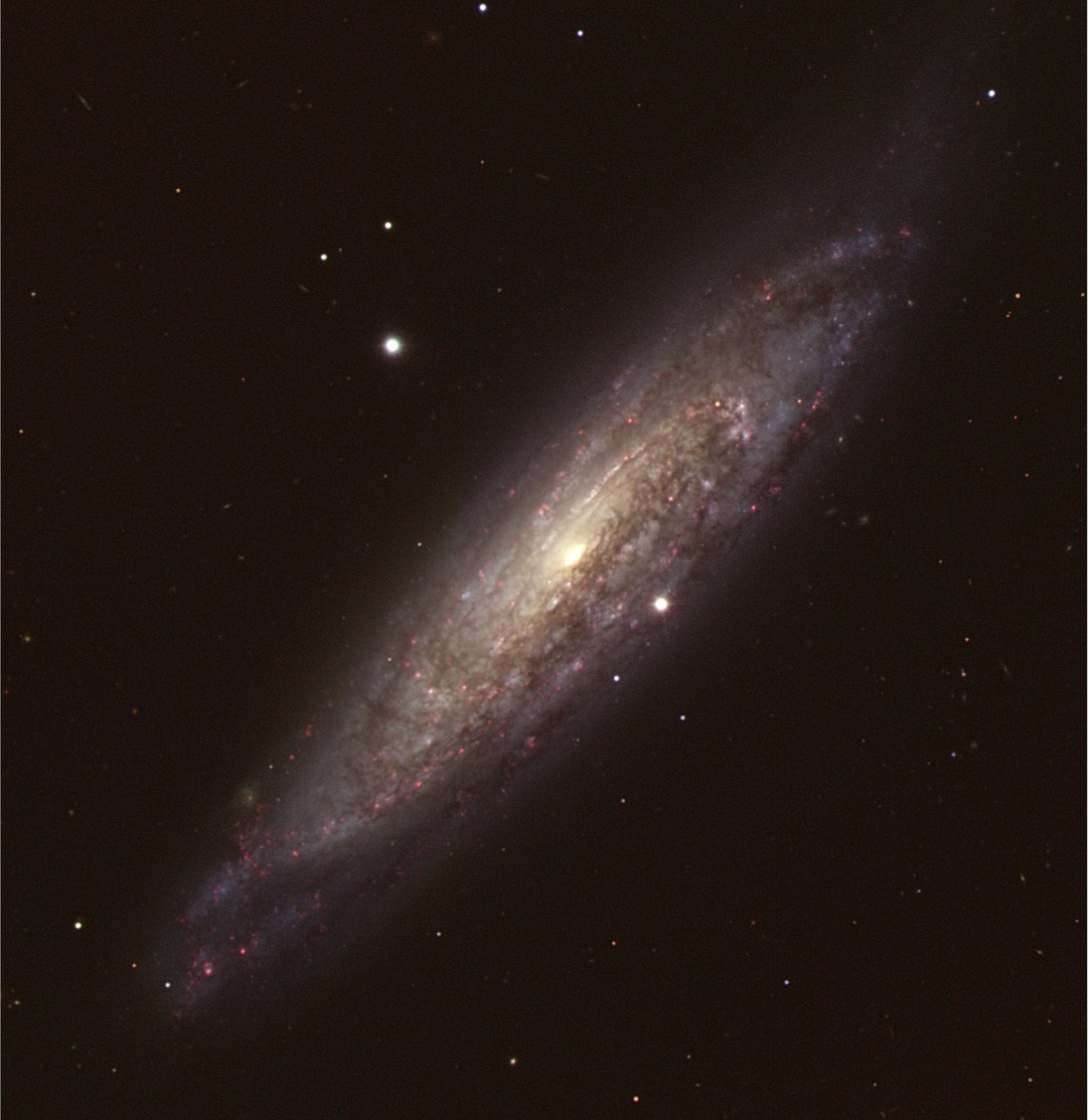
- NGC 134 imaged using the ESO's Very Large Telescope (VLT) at Paranal in 2007

Observation data (J2000 epoch)
- Constellation: Sculptor
- Right ascension: 00^{h} 30^{m} 21.97^{s}
- Declination: −33° 14′ 38.5″
- Redshift: 0.005277
- Distance: 60 million light years
- Apparent magnitude (V): 10.40

Characteristics
- Type: Sbc
- Apparent size (V): 8.4′×1.8′ (arcmin)

Other designations
- ESO 350-23; PGC 001851, MGC -06-02-012

NGC 134, also known as the Giant Squid Galaxy, is a barred spiral galaxy that resembles the Milky Way with its spiral arms loosely wrapped around a bright, bar-shaped central region. Its loosely bound spiral arms categorize it as Hubble-type Sbc. It is 60 million light years away, and lies in the constellation Sculptor.

The VLT image of the galaxy (shown right) reveals the following. A prominent feature of NGC 134 is its warped disc, i.e., when viewed sideways it does not appear flat. A trail of gas is stripped from the top edge of the disc. Together, these features suggest that it interacted with another galaxy, but that remains unproven. The galaxy has an abundance of ionized hydrogen regions along its spiral arms where stars are forming. These regions appear red in the picture. It also has many dark lanes of dust that occlude its complete starlight.

The discovery of NGC 134 is often attributed to Sir John Herschel at the Cape of Good Hope, but he did note that it might have been the 590th object discovered by James Dunlop in his 1828 publication, six years prior to Herschel's own observations. O'Meara has suggested NGC 134 might be named as the Giant Squid Galaxy.

NGC 134 is part of a galaxy group known as LGG 7, together with NGC 115, NGC 131, IC 1554, NGC 148, IC 1555 and ESO 410-18.

== Supernova ==
One Supernova has been observed in NGC 134: SN 2009gj (Type IIb, mag. 15.9) was discovered by amateur astronomer Stuart Parker in New Zealand on 20 June 2009.

== See also ==
- List of NGC objects (1–1000)
