= NGC 127 =

Galaxy in the constellation of Pisces

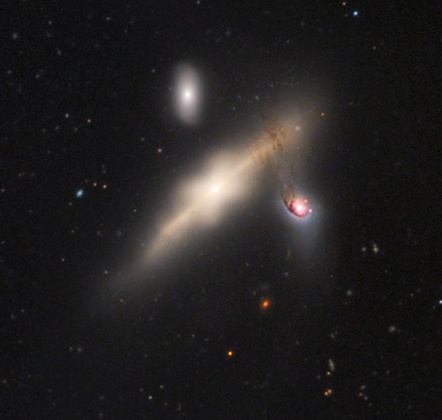
- NGC 127 (right) with parent galaxy NGC 128 (center) and smaller galaxy NGC 130 (left)

Observation data (J2000 epoch)
- Constellation: Pisces
- Right ascension: 00^{h} 29^{m} 12.396^{s}
- Declination: +02° 52′ 21.24″
- Redshift: 0.013656
- Heliocentric radial velocity: 4,061±15 km/s
- Distance: 190 Mly (57 Mpc)h^{−1}_{0.73}
- Group or cluster: NGC 128
- Apparent magnitude (V): 14.5

Characteristics
- Type: Sa
- Apparent size (V): 0.8′ x 0.6′

Other designations
- IRAS 00266+0235, NGC 127, PGC 1787

NGC 127 is a lenticular galaxy that was discovered on November 4, 1850, by Bindon Stoney, the same day he discovered NGC 126 and NGC 130. NGC 127 is a gas-rich, star-forming galaxy showing emission lines. It is an interacting companion to the peculiar, edge-on galaxy NGC 128, and the pair are connected by a bridge of material. The south-east part of NGC 127 is asymmetrical in the direction of NGC 128. It may have recently passed the more massive NGC 128, from which an infall of gas is flowing onto NGC 127.
