= NGC 130 =

Lenticular galaxy in Pisces

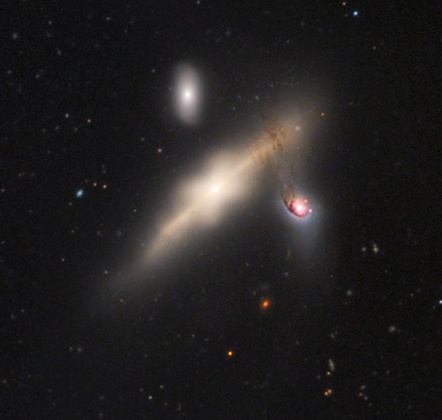
- NGC 130 is the left galaxy next to parent galaxy NGC 128 and smaller galaxy NGC 127 (right)

Observation data (J2000 epoch)
- Constellation: Pisces
- Right ascension: 00^{h} 29^{m} 18.5^{s}
- Declination: +02° 52′ 14″
- Redshift: 0.014787
- Heliocentric radial velocity: 4433 km/s
- Apparent magnitude (V): 15

Characteristics
- Type: SA0^{−}

Other designations
- PGC 1794

NGC 130 is an unbarred lenticular galaxy. It was discovered on November 4, 1850 by Bindon Stoney, the very same day he discovered NGC 126 and NGC 127. This galaxy belongs in the NGC 128 group of galaxies.
