= NGC 126 =

Galaxy in the constellation Pisces

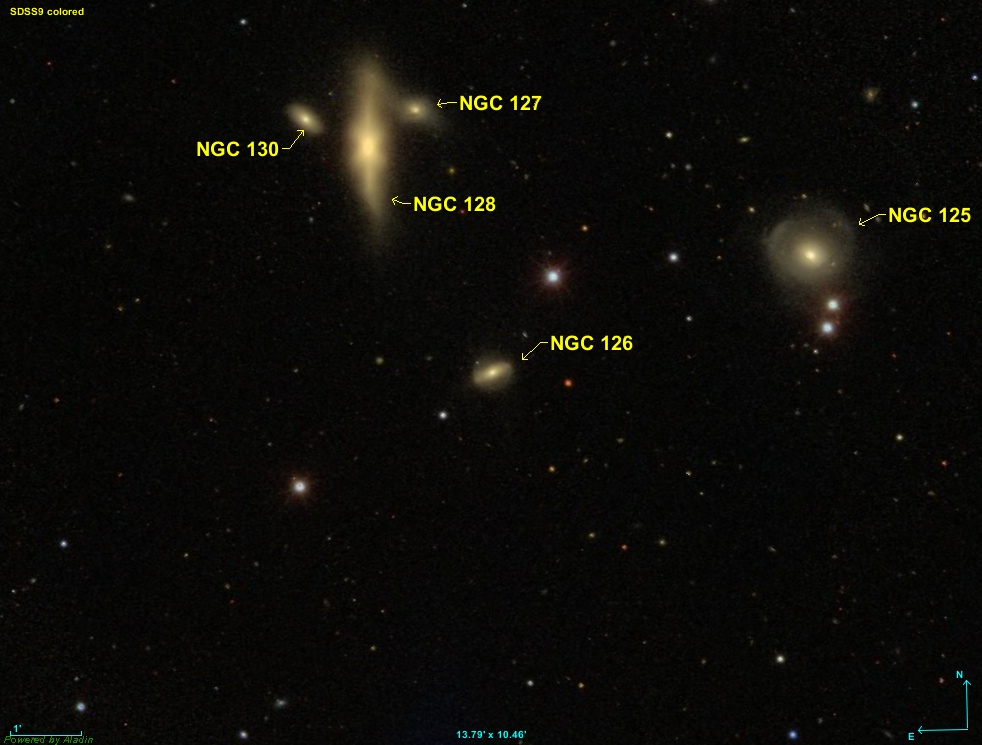
- NGC 126 (middle galaxy, also labeled)

Observation data (J2000 epoch)
- Constellation: Pisces
- Right ascension: 00^{h} 29^{m} 08.1^{s}
- Declination: +01° 48′ 40″
- Redshift: 0.013499
- Heliocentric radial velocity: 4047 km/s
- Apparent magnitude (V): 15.22

Characteristics
- Type: SB0

Other designations
- PGC 1784

NGC 126 is a lenticular galaxy that was discovered on November 4, 1850, by Bindon Stoney, the very same day he discovered NGC 127 and NGC 130.
