= NGC 148 =

Galaxy in the constellation of Sculptor

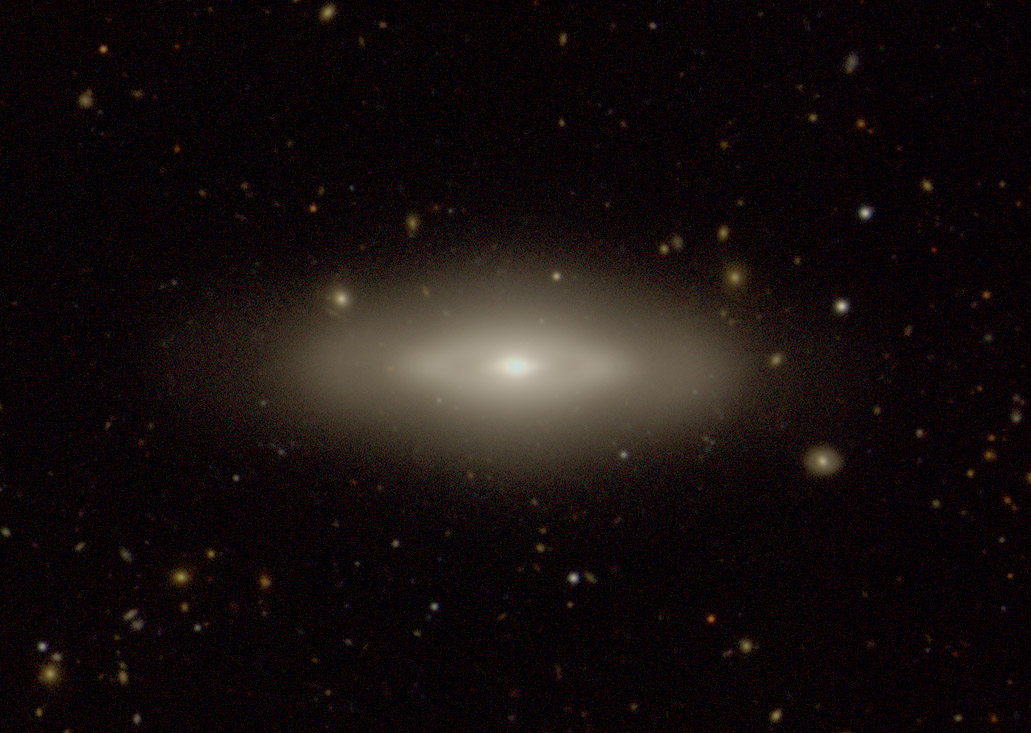
- NGC 148 (DECam)

Observation data (J2000 epoch)
- Constellation: Sculptor
- Right ascension: 00^{h} 34^{m} 15.5^{s}
- Declination: −31° 47′ 10″
- Redshift: 0.005057
- Heliocentric radial velocity: 1516 km/s
- Distance: 85.56 Mly
- Apparent magnitude (V): 13.28

Characteristics
- Type: S0
- Apparent size (V): 1.463' x 0.556'

Other designations
- PGC 2035, MCG-05-02-017

NGC 148 (also known as PGC 2035) is a lenticular galaxy located in the constellation Sculptor. It is about 40,000 light years across. It is in a group of three galaxies along with MCG-5-2-16 and IC 1555. It is a Shapley-Ames galaxy.
