= NGC 192 =

Spiral galaxy in the constellation Cetus

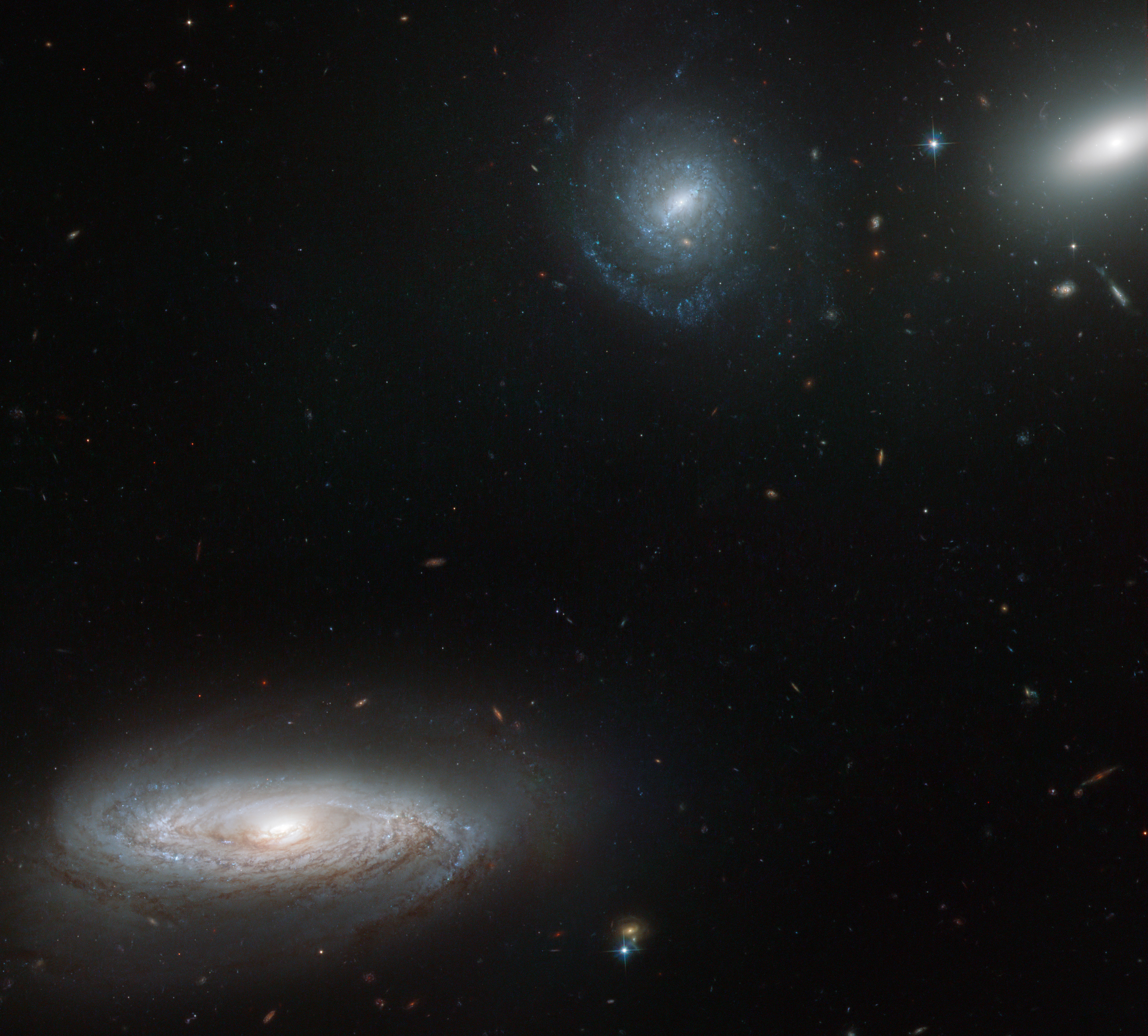
- NGC 192 (bottom left) as taken by the Hubble Space Telescope

Observation data (J2000 epoch)
- Constellation: Cetus
- Right ascension: 00^{h} 39^{m} 13.4^{s}
- Declination: +00° 51′ 52″
- Redshift: 0.013787
- Apparent magnitude (V): 13.42

Characteristics
- Type: (R')SB(r)a:
- Apparent size (V): 1.9' × 0.9'

Other designations
- UGC 00401, CGCG 383-051, MCG +00-02-104, 2MASX J00391339+0051508, IRAS 00366+0035, IRAS F00366+0035, PGC 2352, The Borris Star ISD 0448401.

NGC 192 is a spiral galaxy in the constellation Cetus. It was discovered on December 28, 1790, by William Herschel.

NGC 192 is part of a galaxy group known as LGG 10, together with 4 core members: NGC 173, NGC 196, NGC 201, NGC 237 and 1 possible member: NGC 197. It is also considered part of HCG 7 along with NGC 201, NGC 196, and NGC 197.
