= NGC 173 =

Spiral galaxy in the constellation Cetus

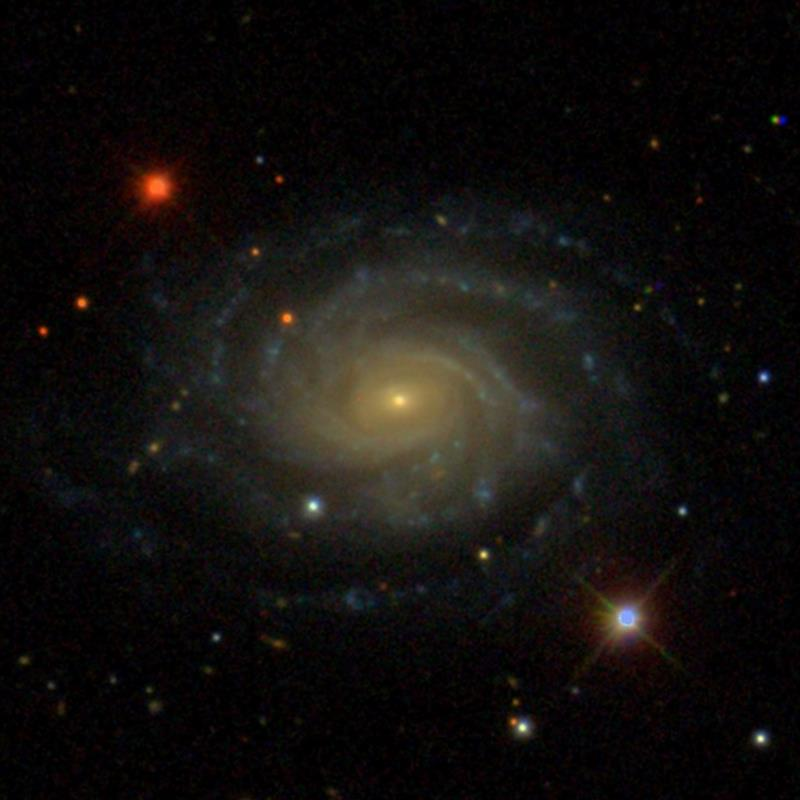
- SDSS image of NGC 173

Observation data (J2000 epoch)
- Constellation: Cetus
- Right ascension: 00^{h} 37^{m} 12.5^{s}
- Declination: +01° 56′ 32″
- Redshift: 0.014563
- Apparent magnitude (V): 13.7

Characteristics
- Type: SA(rs)c
- Apparent size (V): 3.2' × 2.6'

Other designations
- IRAS F00346+0140, 2MASX J00371247+0156321, UGC 369, MCG +00-02-092, PGC 2223, CGCG 383-043

NGC 173 is an unbarred spiral galaxy located approximately 3.8 million light-years away in the constellation Cetus.

NGC 173 is part of a galaxy group known as NGC 192 Group or LGG 10, together with 4 core members: NGC 192, NGC 196, NGC 201, NGC 237 and 1 possible member: NGC 197.
