= NGC 237 =

Galaxy located in the constellation Cetus

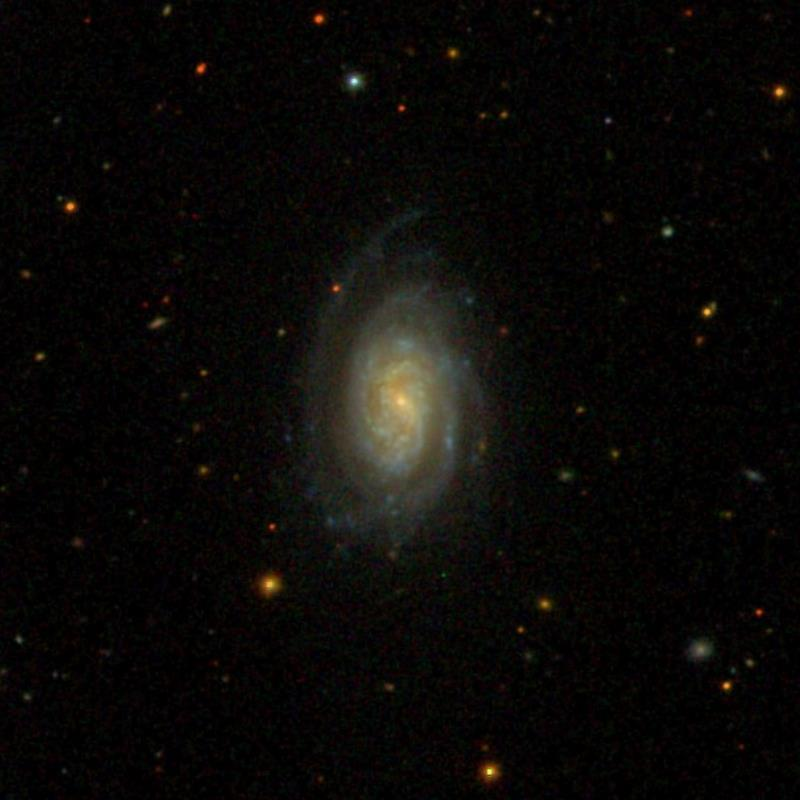
- SDSS view of NGC 237

Observation data (J2000 epoch)
- Constellation: Cetus
- Right ascension: 00^{h} 43^{m} 27.8^{s}
- Declination: −00° 07′ 30″
- Redshift: 0.013926
- Apparent magnitude (V): 13.7

Characteristics
- Type: SAB(rs)cd
- Apparent size (V): 1.6' × 0.9'

Other designations
- UGC 461, CGCG 383-079, MCG +00-02-136, 2MASX J00432788-0007295, 2MASXi J0043278-000730, IRAS 00408-0023, 6dF J0043277-000730, PGC 2597.

NGC 237 is a spiral galaxy located in the constellation Cetus. It was discovered on September 27, 1867, by Truman Safford.

NGC 237 is part of a galaxy group known as NGC 192 Group or LGG 10, together with 4 core members: NGC 173, NGC 196, NGC 201, NGC 192 and 1 possible member: NGC 197.

== Image gallery ==
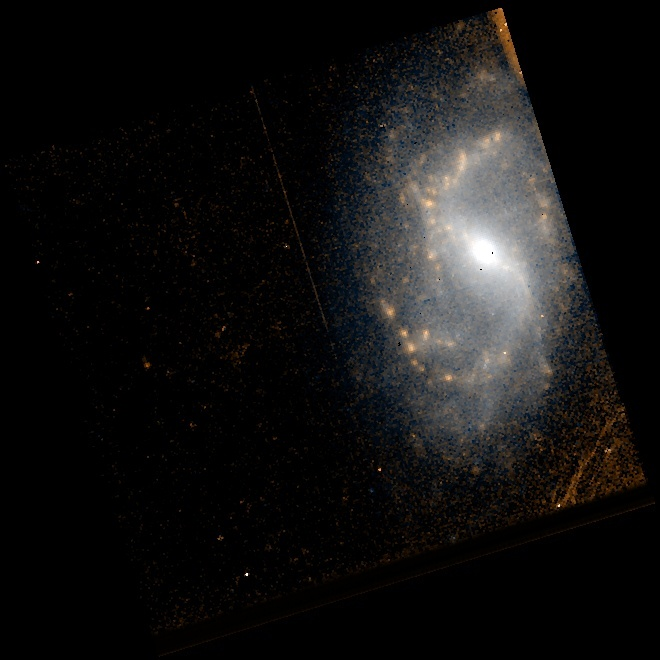
NGC 237 (HST)
