= NGC 201 =

Spiral galaxy in the constellation Cetus

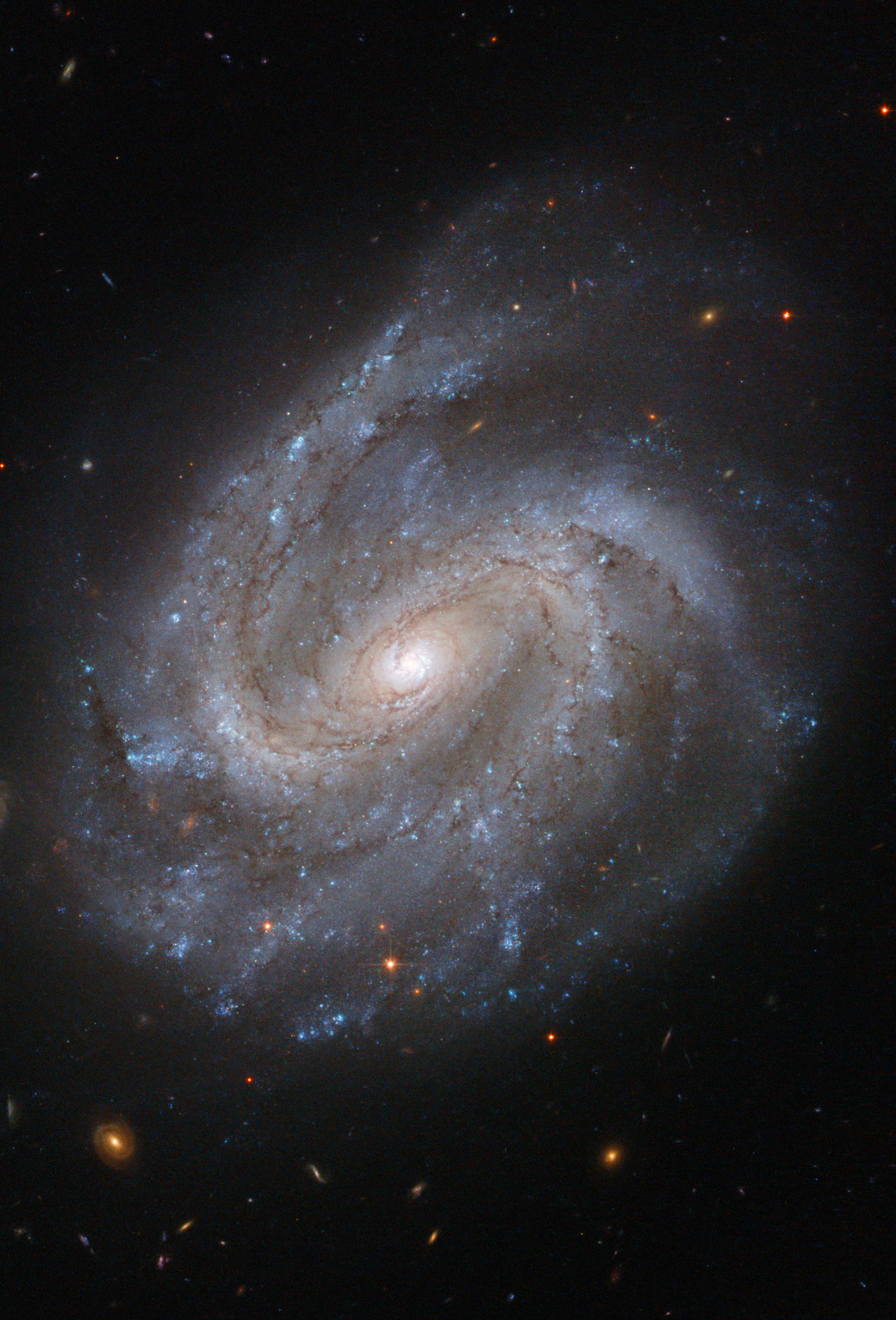
- Hubble Space Telescope image of NGC 201

Observation data (J2000 epoch)
- Constellation: Cetus
- Right ascension: 00^{h} 39^{m} 34.820^{s}
- Declination: 00° 51′ 35.60″
- Redshift: 0.014728 ± 0.000062
- Heliocentric radial velocity: 4415 ± 19 km/s
- Galactocentric velocity: 4505 ± 19 km/s
- Distance: 61.7 ± 4.3 kpc (201 ± 14 kly)h^{−1}_{0.73}
- Apparent magnitude (V): 13.8

Characteristics
- Type: SAB(r)c
- Size: 163,230 ly (50.07 kpc) (estimated)
- Apparent size (V): 1.8' x 1.5'

Other designations
- PGC 2388, UGC 419, MCG +00-02-115, HCG 007C

NGC 201 is a spiral galaxy in the constellation of Cetus. It is one of the group members of HCG 7, with the other group members NGC 192, NGC 196, and NGC 197. It was discovered on December 28, 1790 by William Herschel.

NGC 201 is also considered part of a galaxy group known as NGC 192 Group or LGG 10, together with 4 core members: NGC 173, NGC 192, NGC 196, NGC 237 and 1 possible member: NGC 197.

One supernova has been observed in NGC 201: SN 2019yc (Type IIb, mag. 16.7) was discovered by Kōichi Itagaki on 22 January 2019.

== See also ==
- List of NGC objects (1–1000)

== Image gallery ==
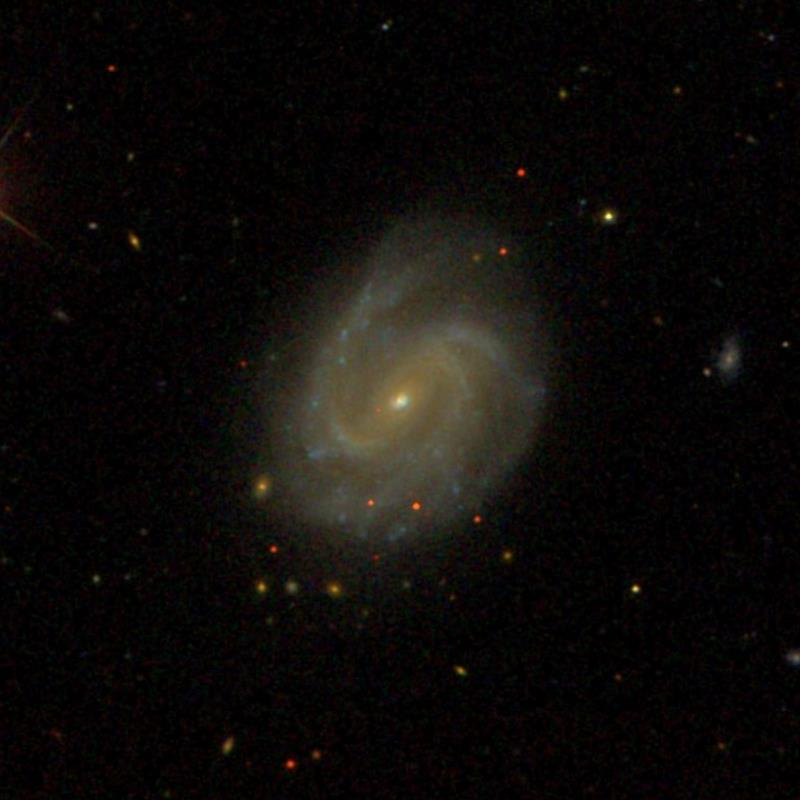
NGC 201 (SDSS)

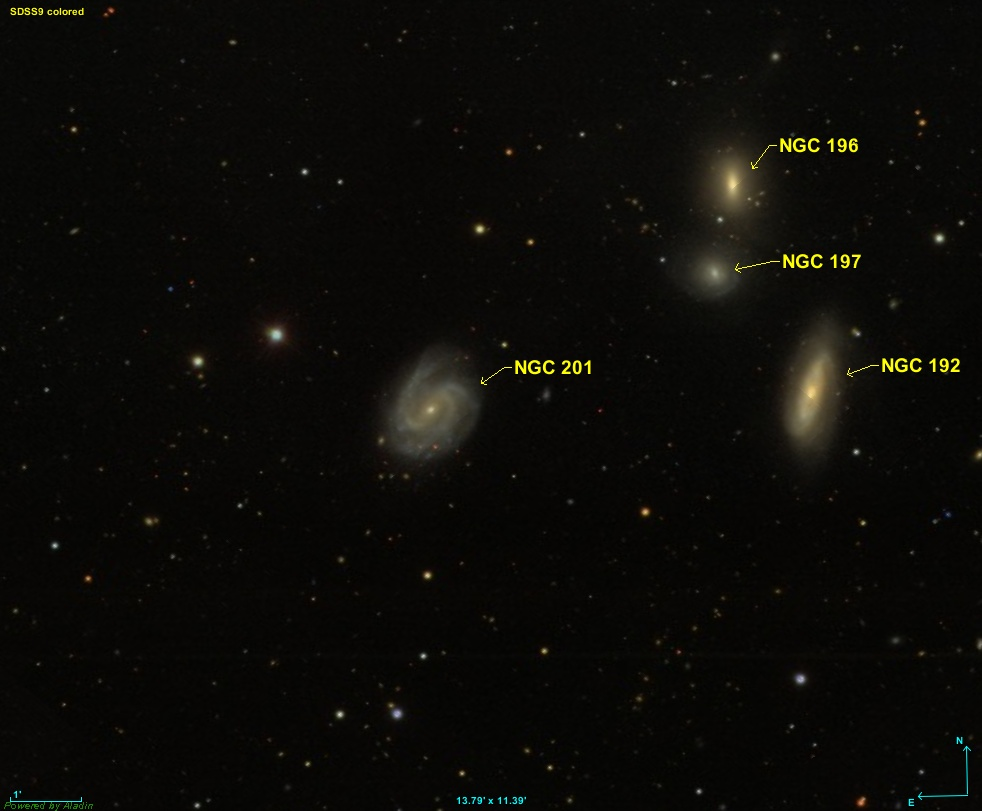
NGC 201 with nearby galaxies (SDSS)
