= NGC 197 =

Galaxy in the constellation Cetus

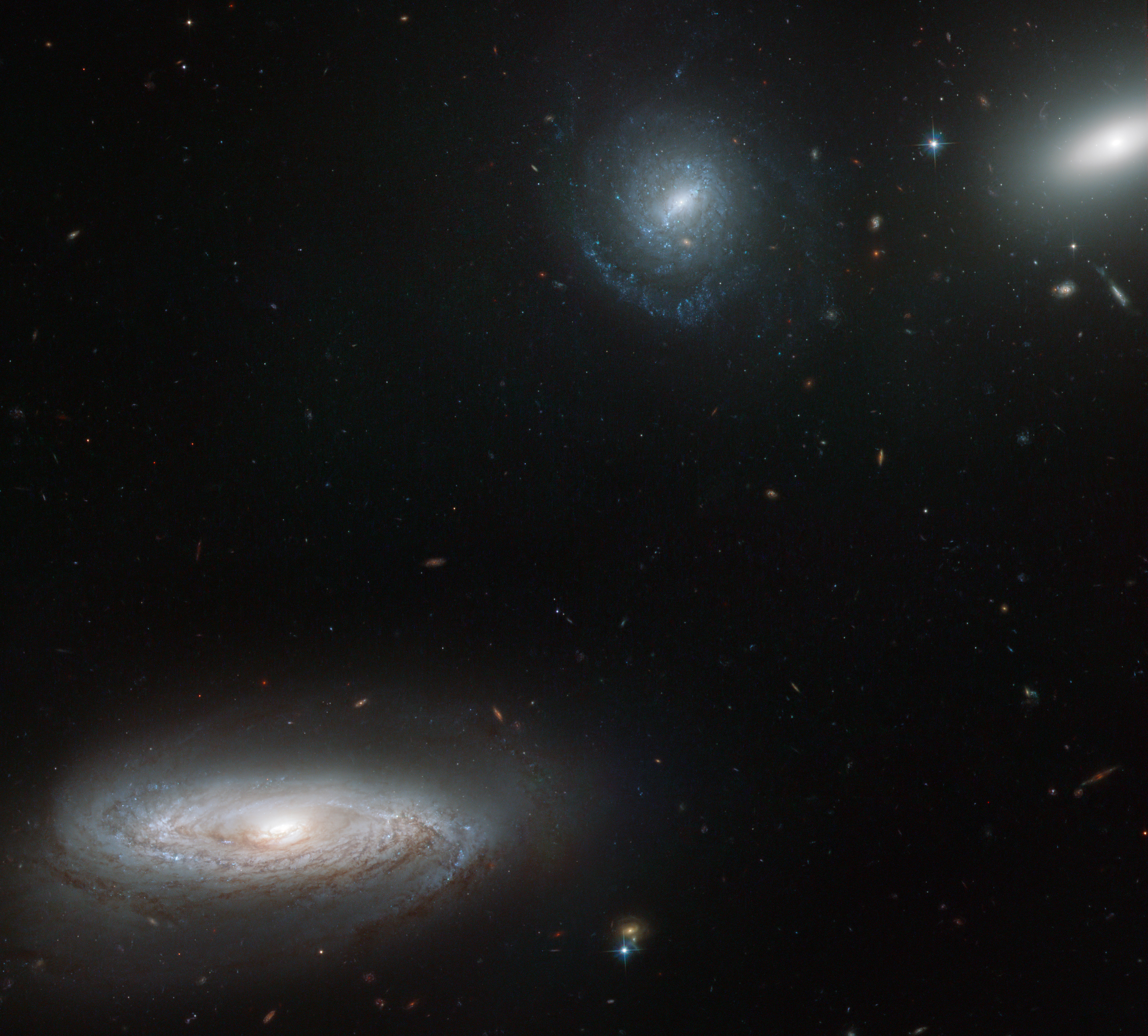
- NGC 197 is the galaxy near the top center

Observation data (J2000 epoch)
- Constellation: Cetus
- Right ascension: 00^{h} 39^{m} 18.8^{s}
- Declination: +00° 53′ 31″
- Redshift: 0.013746
- Apparent magnitude (V): 15.4g

Characteristics
- Type: SB0
- Apparent size (V): 0.95' × 0.76'

Other designations
- UGC 406, MCG +00-02-110, 2MASX J00391879+0053308, PGC 2365.

NGC 197 is a lenticular galaxy located in the constellation Cetus. It was discovered on October 16, 1863 by Albert Marth. It is one of the group members of HCG 7, with the other group members NGC 192, NGC 196, and NGC 201.

NGC 197 is possible to be part of a galaxy group known as LGG 10, together with 5 core members: NGC 173, NGC 196, NGC 201, NGC 237 and NGC 192.

== See also ==
- List of NGC objects (1–1000)
