= NGC 196 =

Lenticular galaxy in the constellation Cetus

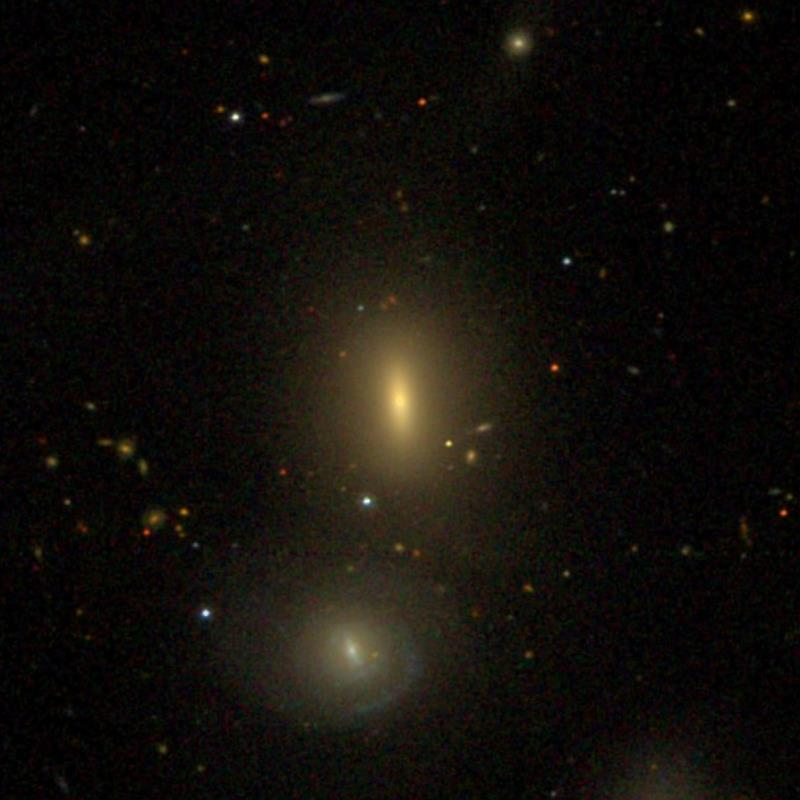
- NGC 196 (above) and NGC 197 (below) by the SDSS

Observation data (J2000 epoch)
- Constellation: Cetus
- Right ascension: 00^{h} 39^{m} 17.8^{s}
- Declination: +00° 54′ 46″
- Redshift: 0.014193
- Apparent magnitude (V): 13.80

Characteristics
- Type: S0
- Apparent size (V): 1.2' × 0.8'

Other designations
- UGC 405, MCG +00-02-107, 2MASX J00391786+0054458, PGC 2357.

NGC 196 is a lenticular galaxy located in the constellation Cetus. It was discovered on December 28, 1790 by William Herschel. It is one of the group members of HCG 7, with the other group members NGC 192, NGC 201, and NGC 197.

NGC 196 is also part of a galaxy group known as NGC 192 Group or LGG 10, together with 4 core members: NGC 173, NGC 192, NGC 201, NGC 237 and 1 possible member: NGC 197.
