= NGC 328 =

Galaxy in the constellation Phoenix

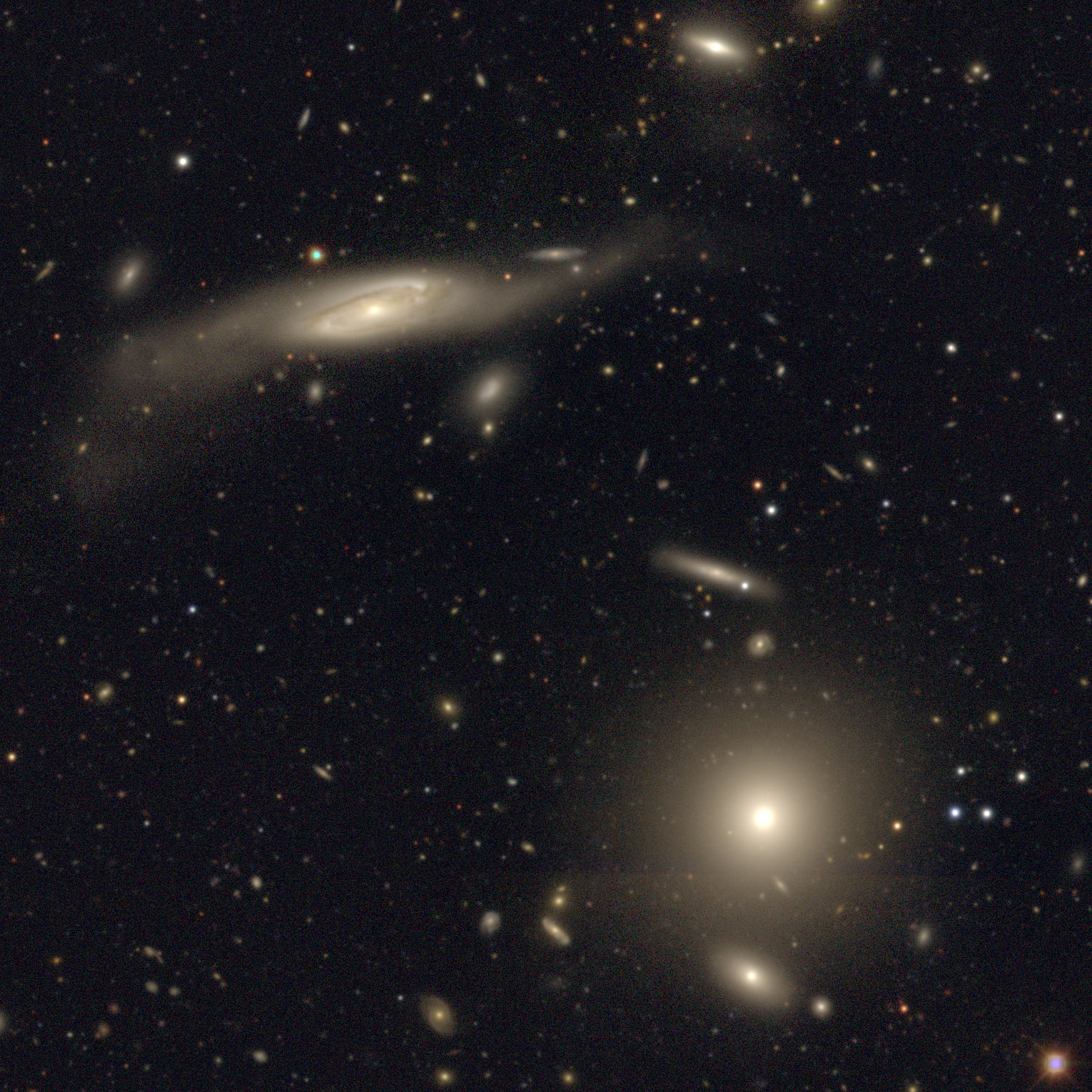
- NGC 328 (top left) and NGC 323 (bottom right) with DECam

Observation data (J2000 epoch)
- Constellation: Phoenix
- Right ascension: 00^{h} 56^{m} 57.6^{s}
- Declination: −52° 55′ 26″
- Redshift: 0.024494
- Heliocentric radial velocity: 7,343 km/s
- Apparent magnitude (V): 14.24

Characteristics
- Type: SBa
- Apparent size (V): 2.7′ × 0.5′

Other designations
- ESO 151- G 013, 2MASX J00565758-5255262, ESO-LV 1510130, PGC 3399

NGC 328 is a spiral galaxy in the constellation Phoenix. It was discovered on 5 September 1836 by John Herschel. It was described by Dreyer as "very faint, a little extended, very gradually brighter middle, following (eastern) of 2", the other being NGC 323.
