= NGC 323 =

Galaxy in the constellation Phoenix

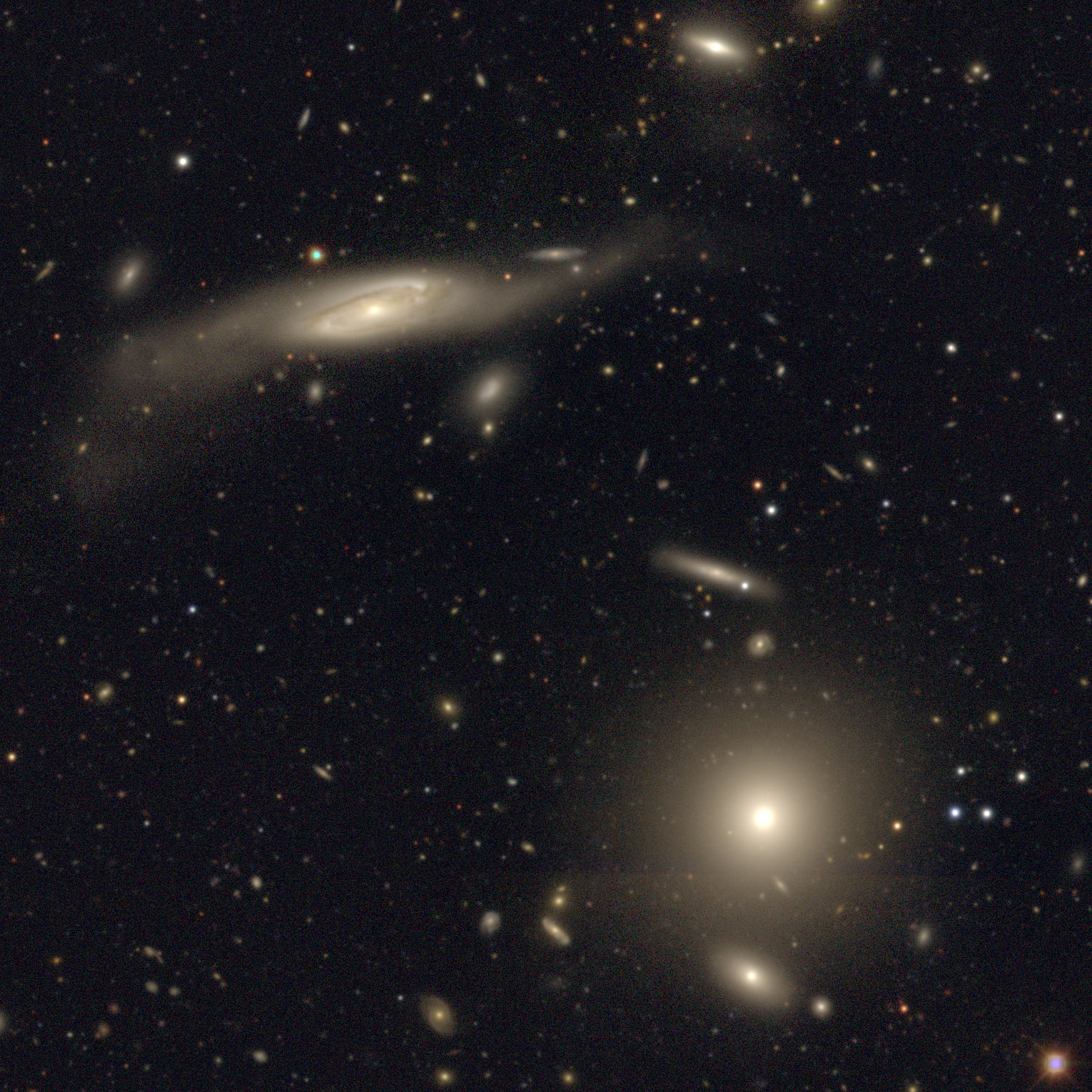
- NGC 323 (bottom right) and NGC 328 (top left) with DECam

Observation data (J2000 epoch)
- Constellation: Phoenix
- Right ascension: 00^{h} 56^{m} 41.6^{s}
- Declination: −52° 58′ 33″
- Redshift: 0.025948
- Heliocentric radial velocity: 7,779 km/s
- Apparent magnitude (V): 13.59

Characteristics
- Type: E0
- Apparent size (V): 1.0' × 1.0'

Other designations
- ESO 151- G 009, 2MASX J00564165-5258332, ESO-LV 1510090, PGC 3374.

NGC 323 is an elliptical galaxy located in the constellation Phoenix. It was discovered on October 3, 1834, by John Herschel. It was described by Dreyer as "pretty faint, small, round, brighter middle, preceding (western) of 2", the other being NGC 328.
