= NGC 50 =

Galaxy in the constellation Cetus

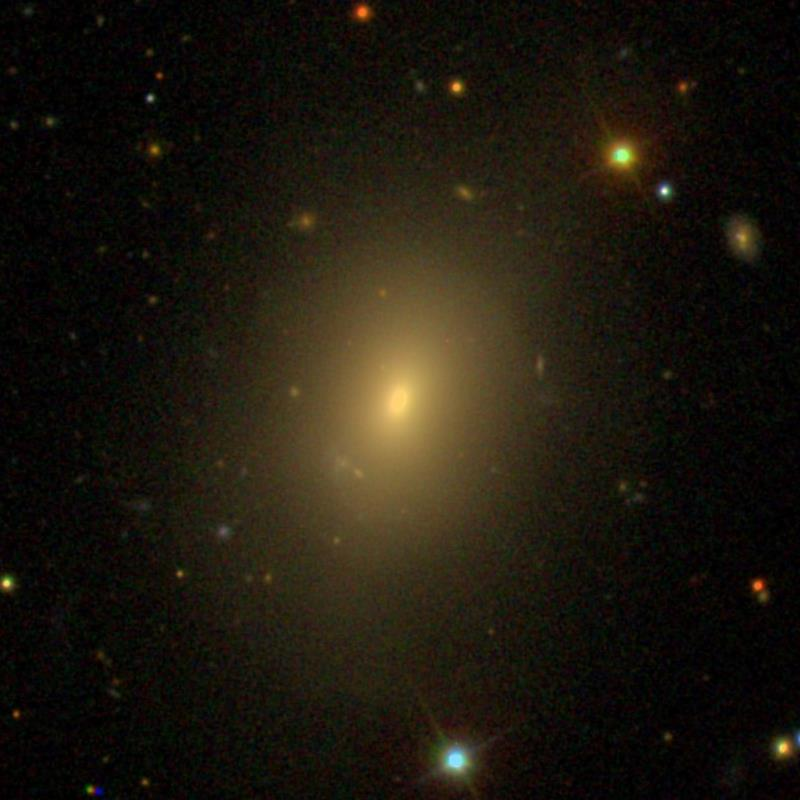
- SDSS image of NGC 50

Observation data (2000.0 epoch)
- Constellation: Cetus
- Right ascension: 00^{h} 14^{m} 44.555^{s}
- Declination: −07° 20′ 42.38″
- Redshift: 0.019016
- Heliocentric radial velocity: 5700 km/s
- Distance: 257,000,000 ly (75,000,000 pc)
- Apparent magnitude (V): 12

Characteristics
- Type: E5
- Size: 170,000
- Apparent size (V): 2.344' x 1.445'

Other designations
- MCG -01-01-058, 2MASX J00144455-0720423, 6dF J0014445-072042, LDCE 0010 NED003, HDCE 0009 NED003, USGC S005 NED01, GSC 4670-01062, PGC 983, NVSS J001444-072041

NGC 50 is an elliptical galaxy in the constellation Cetus with a diameter of 170,000 light-years. It was discovered in 1865 by Gaspare Ferrari. The galaxy is, in comparison to the Milky Way, about 1.5-2 times as large. It is also physically close to NGC 49.

Other names for NGC 50 are MCG -1-1-58 and PGC 983.

== See also ==
- List of NGC objects (1–1000)
- Elliptical galaxy
