= NGC 49 =

Lenticular galaxy in the constellation Andromeda

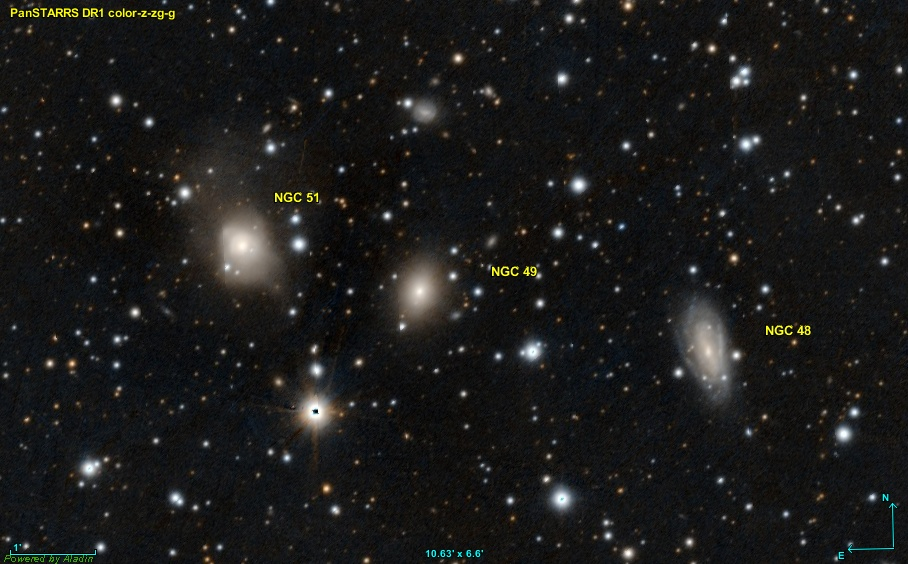
- Pan-STARRS image of NGC 49

Observation data (J2000 epoch)
- Constellation: Andromeda
- Right ascension: 00^{h} 14^{m} 22.4^{s}
- Declination: +48° 14′ 48″
- Redshift: 0.015924
- Heliocentric radial velocity: (+4774 ± 24) km/s
- Distance: 225 ± 16 Mly (69.0 ± 4.9 Mpc)
- Apparent magnitude (V): +14.1
- Apparent magnitude (B): +15.1

Characteristics
- Type: S0?
- Apparent size (V): 1.1′ × 1.0′

Other designations
- CGCG 549-029, MCG+08-01-033, PGC 952, UGC 136

NGC 49 is a lenticular galaxy in the constellation Andromeda. The galaxy was discovered by the American astronomer Lewis A. Swift on September 7, 1885.
