= NGC 61 =

Pair of interacting lenticular galaxies in the constellation Cetus

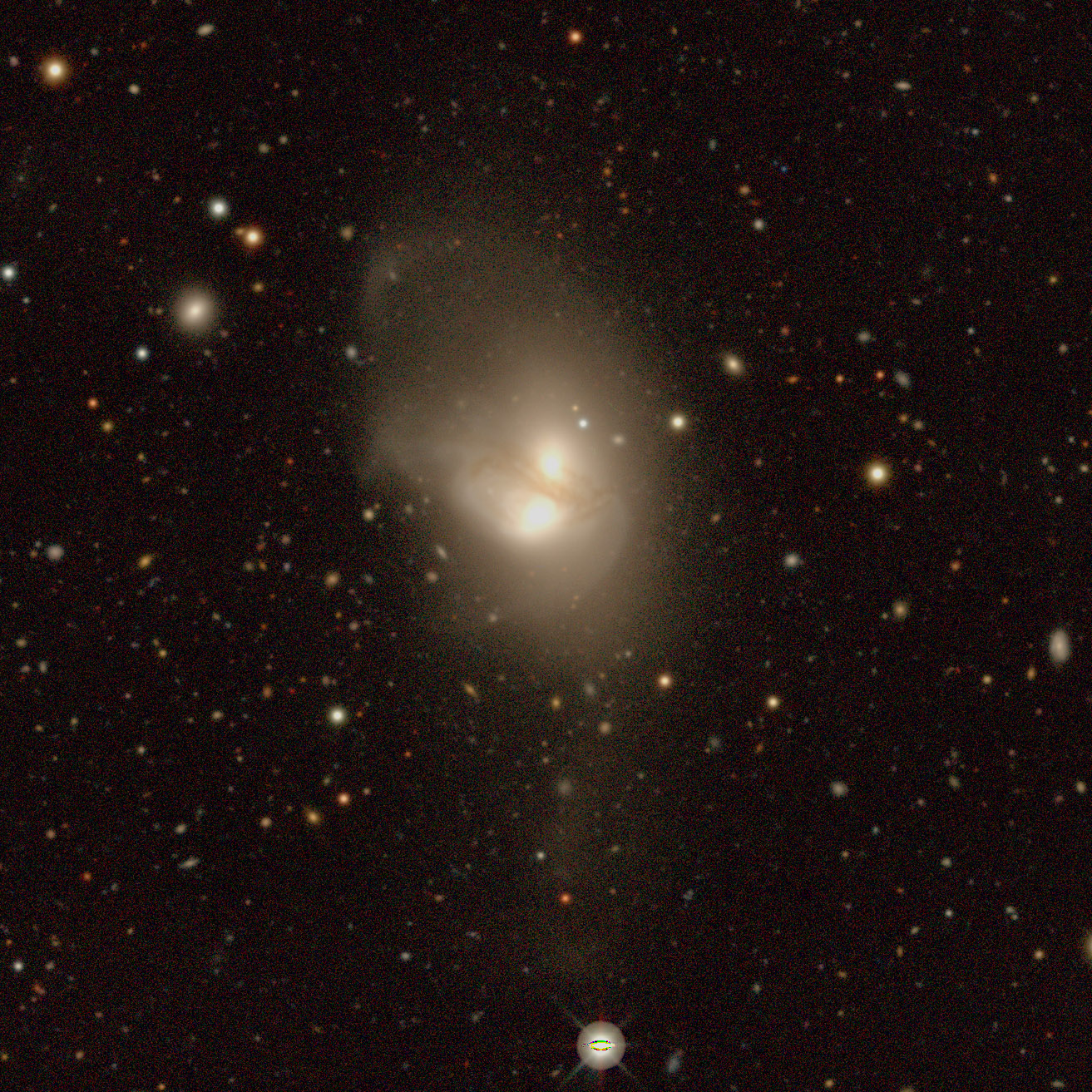
- NGC 61A and NGC 61B (legacy surveys DR9)

Observation data (J2000.0 epoch)
- Constellation: Cetus
- Right ascension: -00^{h} 16^{m} 24.34^{s}
- Declination: −06° 19′ 18.9″
- Heliocentric radial velocity: 7,946 ± 27 km/s
- Apparent magnitude (V): 13.4

Characteristics
- Type: S0 pec:

Other designations
- MCG -01-01-062, PGC 1083

NGC 61B

Observation data (J2000.0 epoch)
- Constellation: Cetus
- Right ascension: 00^{h} 16^{m} 24.07^{s}
- Declination: −06° 19′ 07.9″
- Heliocentric radial velocity: 8,152 ± 27 km/s
- Apparent magnitude (V): 14.5

Other designations
- MCG -01-01-063, PGC 1085

NGC 61 is a pair of lenticular galaxies, NGC 61-A (or NGC 61-1) and NGC 61-B (or NGC 61-2) in the constellation Cetus. Both were discovered on September 10, 1785, by William Herschel.
