= NGC 782 =

Galaxy in the constellation Eridanus

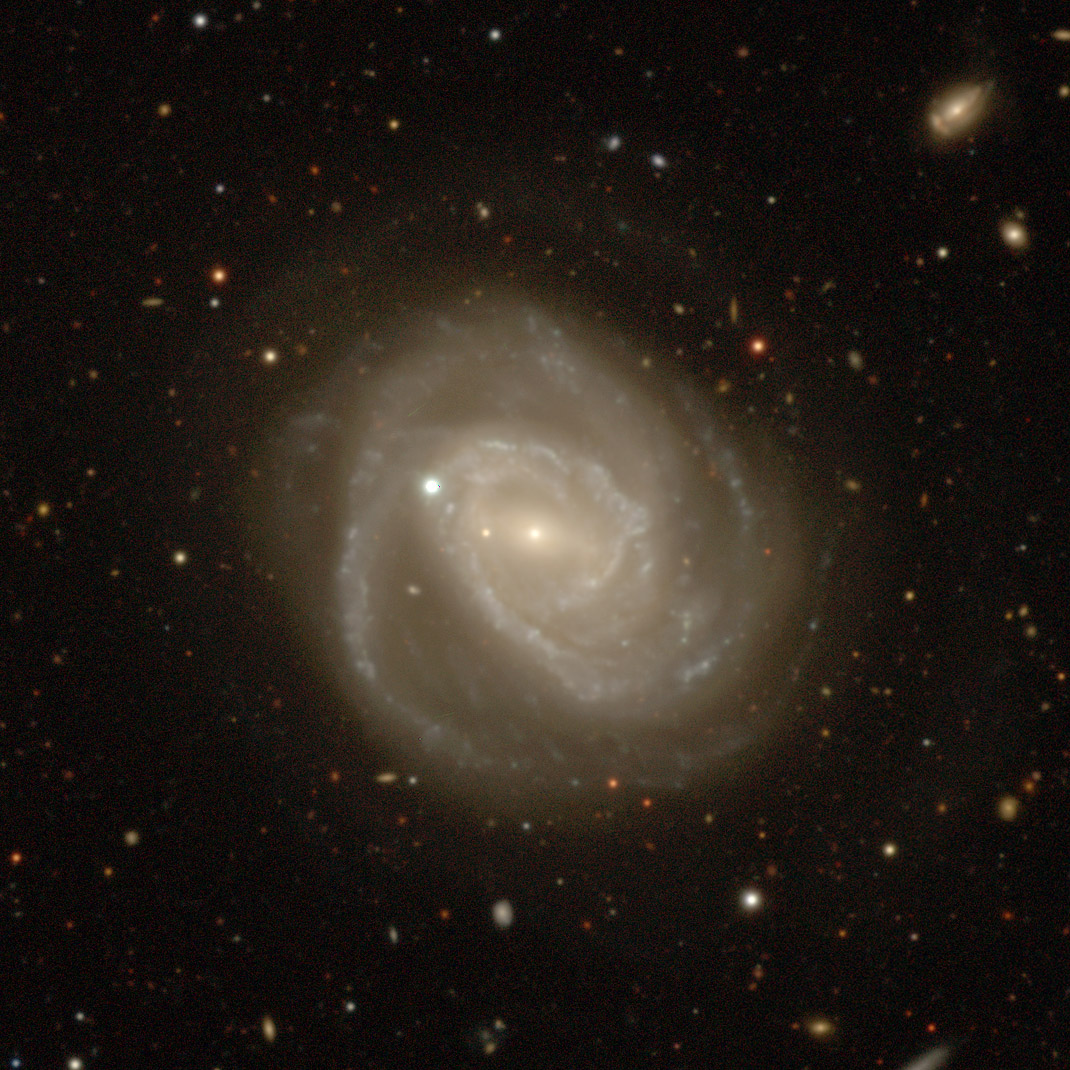
- legacy surveys image of NGC 782

Observation data (J2000 epoch)
- Constellation: Eridanus
- Right ascension: 01^{h} 57^{m} 40.39260^{s}
- Declination: −57° 47′ 24.6052″
- Redshift: 0.020568
- Heliocentric radial velocity: 6102.8 km/s
- Distance: 159.8 Mly (48.98 Mpc)
- Apparent magnitude (B): 12.63

Characteristics
- Type: SB(r)b

Other designations
- PGC 7379

NGC 782 is a barred spiral galaxy located in the constellation Eridanus about 160 million light-years from the Milky Way. It was discovered by British astronomer John Herschel in 1834.

== Supernova ==
One supernova has been observed in NGC 782. SN 2011eb (Type Ia, mag. 15.2) was discovered by Berto Monard on July 9, 2011. It was positioned 29″ west and 34″ south of the galactic core.
