= NGC 84 =

Star in the constellation Andromeda

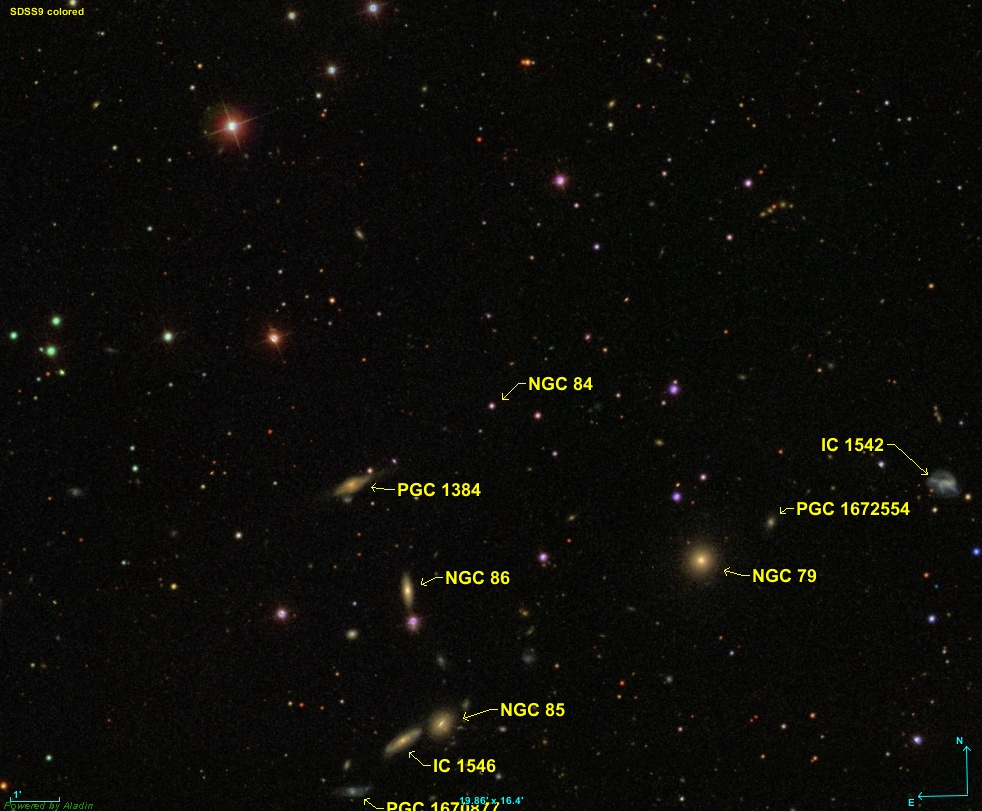
- NGC 84; Credit: SDSS

Observation data Epoch J2000.0 Equinox ICRS
- Constellation: Andromeda
- Right ascension: 00^{h} 21^{m} 21.2^{s}
- Declination: +22° 37′ 11″
- Apparent magnitude (V): 15.3

NGC 84 is a star located in the constellation Andromeda. NGC 84 is often misidentified in astronomical literature as a galaxy rather than a single star. It was first discovered on November 14, 1884, by the French astronomer Guillaume Bigourdan, who is well known for his successes in cataloging faint celestial forms.

NGC stands for the New General Catalogue, a listing of deep space objects like star clusters, nebulae, and galaxies. The NGC includes over 7,800 objects and remains one of the most commonly used astronomical catalogs today.

NGC 84 is located at a right ascension of 00h 21m 21.25s and a declination of +22° 37′ 10.90″. Due to its extreme faintness, it is not visible to the naked eye and requires a telescope for observation.

Located near the celestial equator, NGC 84 can be observed from both the Northern and Southern Hemispheres during certain times of the year. This location offers an opportunity for astronomers to study it, though its low brightness and distant location make it extremely challenging to observe.
