= NGC 622 =

Galaxy in the constellation Cetus

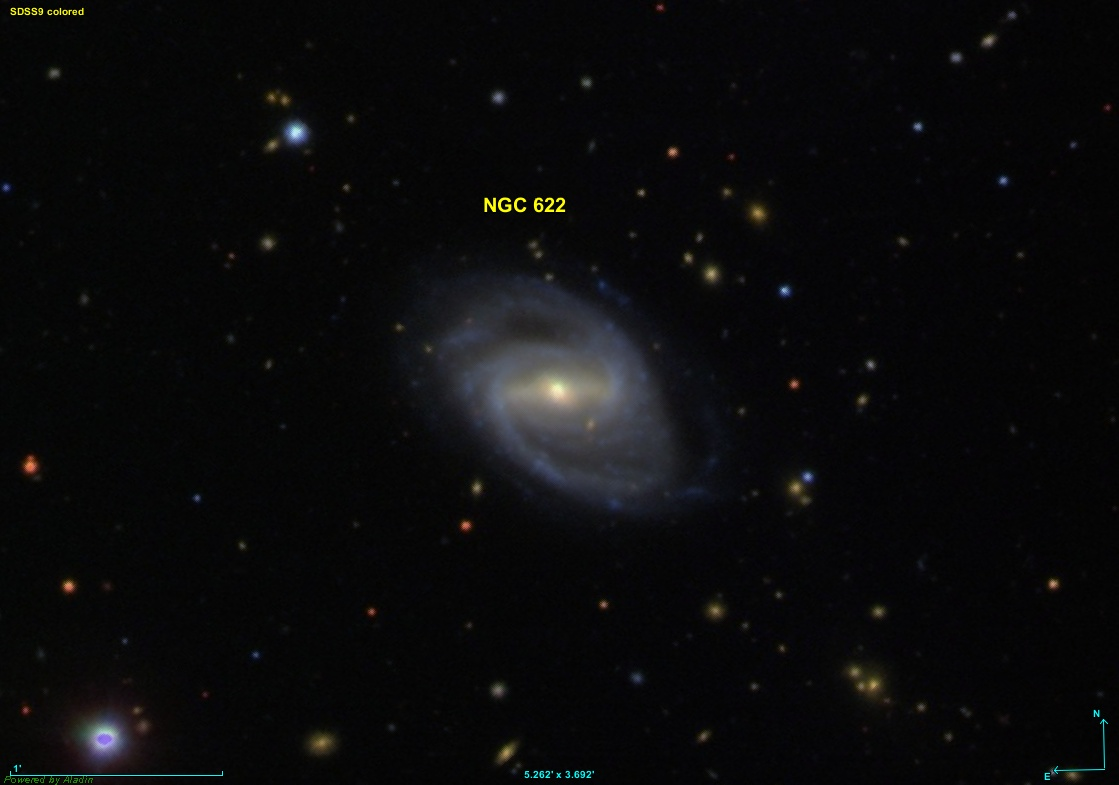
- NGC 622 imaged by the Sloan Digital Sky Survey

Observation data (J2000 epoch)
- Constellation: Cetus
- Right ascension: 01^{h} 36^{m} 00.134^{s}
- Declination: +00° 39′ 48.14″
- Redshift: 0.01722±0.00003
- Heliocentric radial velocity: 5,160.93±8.09
- Distance: 233.9 ± 16.4 Mly (71.72 ± 5.03 Mpc)

Characteristics
- Type: SB(rs)b

Other designations
- UGC 1143, MRK 571, PGC 5939

NGC 622 is a barred spiral galaxy located in the constellation Cetus about 234 million light-years from the Milky Way. It was discovered by British astronomer William Herschel in 1785.
