= NGC 886 =

Star cluster in the constellation Cassiopeia

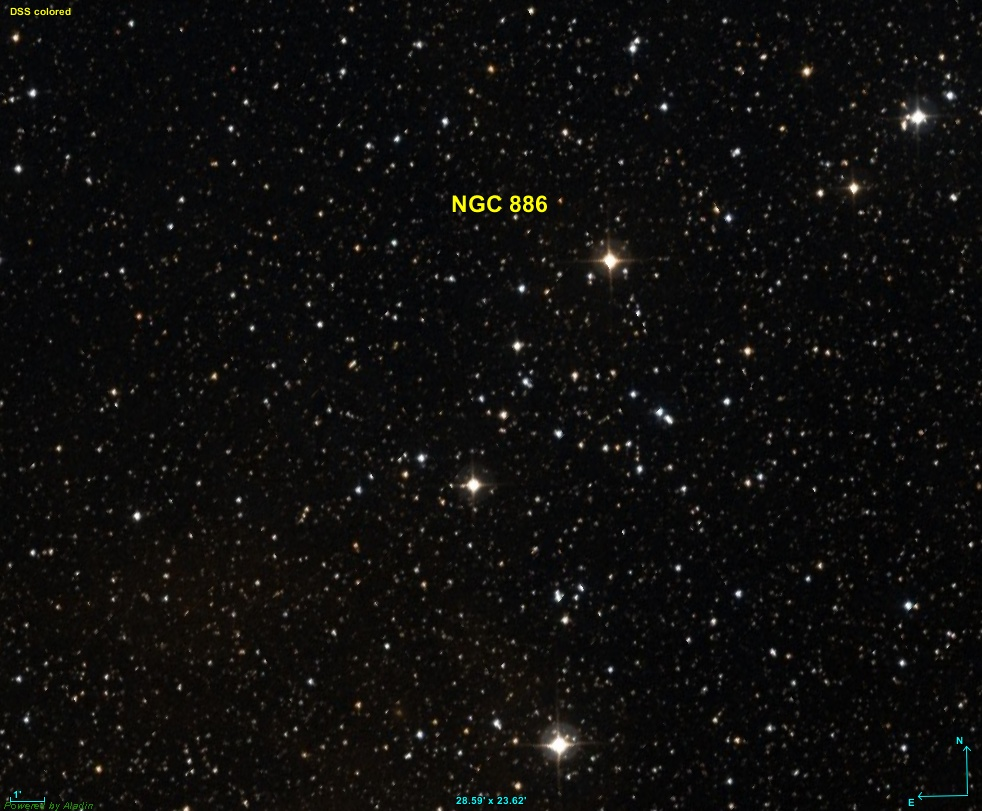
- The open cluster NGC 886

Observation data (J2000 epoch)
- Right ascension: 02^{h} 25^{m} 10^{s}
- Declination: +63° 53′ 35″
- Distance: 5544.67 (1700)

Physical characteristics
- Estimated age: 320 Ma

Associations
- Constellation: Cassiopeia

NGC 886 (also known as [KPS2012] MWSC 0186) is a small open cluster located in the constellation Cassiopeia containing between 20 and 30 stars. It was discovered by 19th century English astronomer John Herschel on 30 October 1829. NGC 886 is moving towards the Sun with a radial velocity of -9.835 km/s±0.948. It is located approximately 5544.67 light years, (1700 pc), from the Earth.
