= NGC 110 =

Open cluster in the constellation Cassiopeia

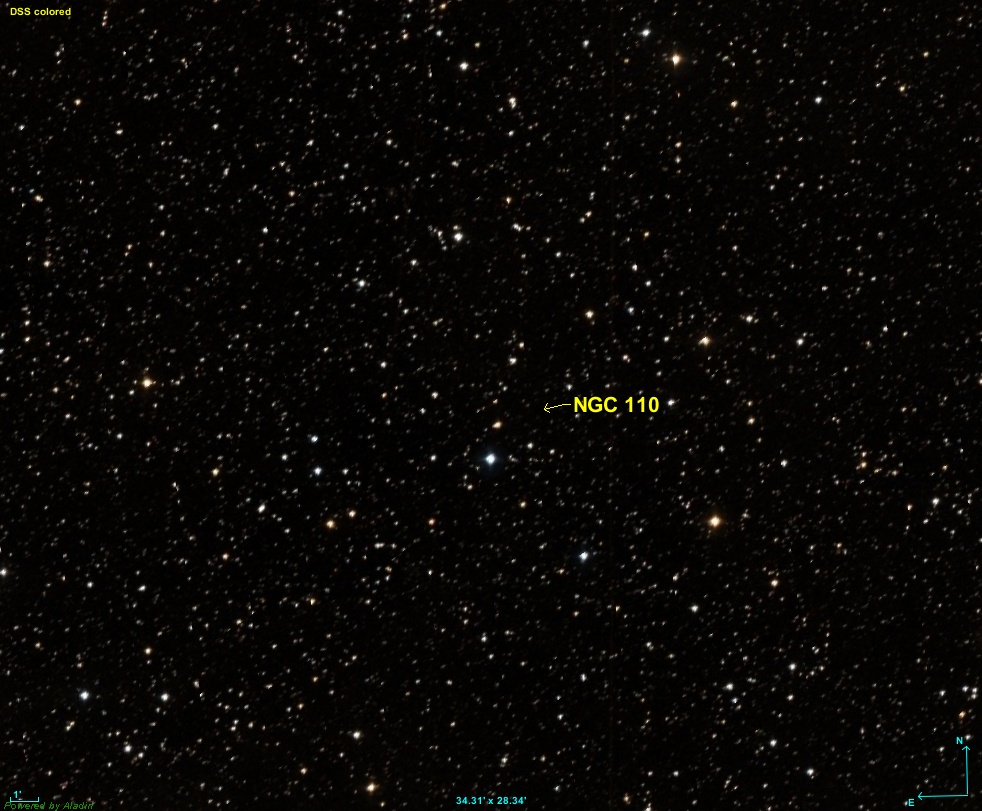
- NGC 110

Observation data (J2000 epoch)
- Right ascension: 00^{h} 27^{m} 25.2^{s}
- Declination: +71° 25′ 19″
- Apparent magnitude (V): 9.0
- Apparent dimensions (V): 20′

Physical characteristics

Associations
- Constellation: Cassiopeia

NGC 110 is an open star cluster located in the constellation Cassiopeia. It was discovered by the English astronomer John Herschel on October 29, 1831.

It is unknown if the members are physically related, or if the cluster exists at all. It is barely visible against the background sky, and the two dozen member stars seem to be at various distances. If the cluster does exist, it is at least 2,000 light years away.
