= NGC 706 =

Galaxy in the constellation Pisces

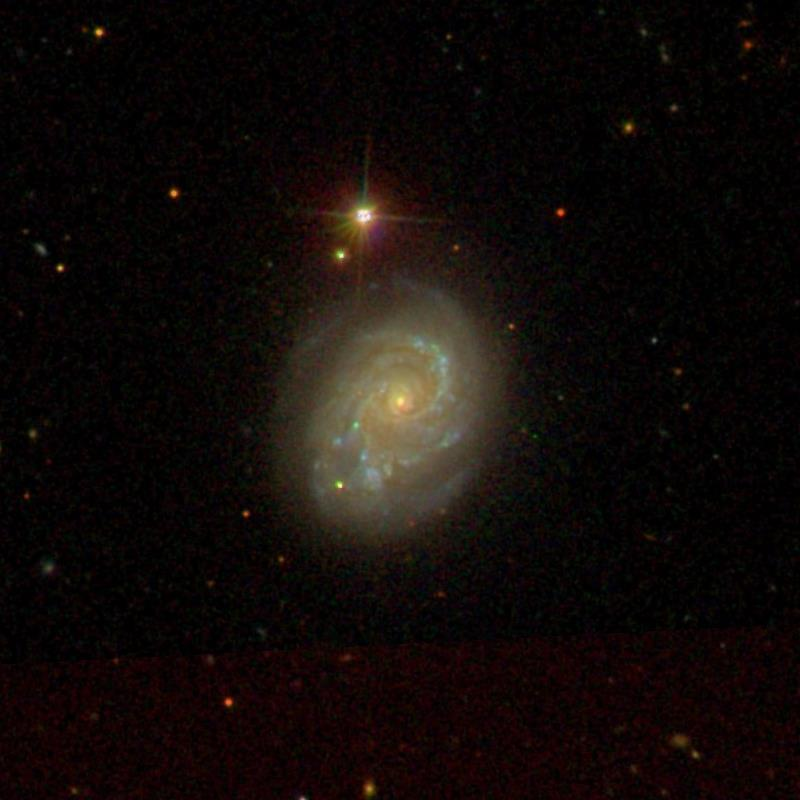
- SDSS image of NGC 706

Observation data (J2000 epoch)
- Constellation: Pisces
- Right ascension: 01^{h} 51^{m} 50.529^{s}
- Declination: +06° 17′ 48.76″
- Redshift: 0.016615
- Heliocentric radial velocity: 4940 km/s
- Distance: 230 Mly (71 Mpc)
- Apparent magnitude (V): 12.50
- Apparent magnitude (B): 13.20

Characteristics
- Type: Sbc?

Other designations
- UGC 1334, MCG +01-05-040, PGC 6897

NGC 706 is a spiral galaxy located in the constellation Pisces about 230 million light years from the Milky Way. It was discovered by German–British astronomer William Herschel in 1786.

== Supernova ==
One supernova has been observed in NGC 706:

- SN 2001ed (Type Ia, mag. 14.9) was discovered by Marco Migliardi on 21 August 2001.

== See also ==
- List of NGC objects (1–1000)
