= NGC 910 =

Galaxy in the constellation Andromeda

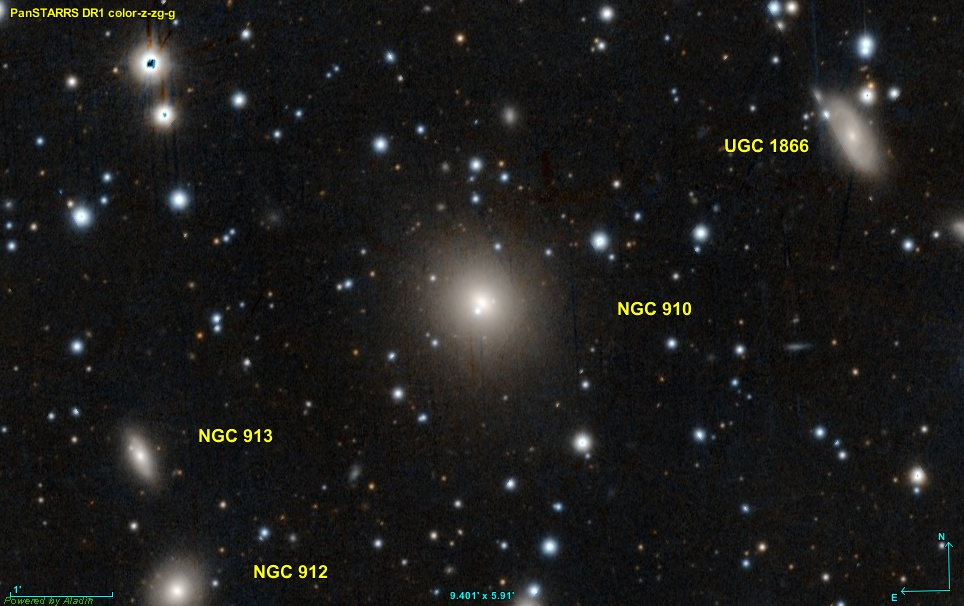
- Pan-STARRS image of NGC 910

Observation data (J2000 epoch)
- Constellation: Andromeda
- Right ascension: 02^{h} 25^{m} 26.772^{s}
- Declination: +41° 49′ 27.50″
- Redshift: 0.017614
- Heliocentric radial velocity: 5234 km/s
- Distance: 213.5 Mly (65.46 Mpc)
- Group or cluster: Abell 347
- Apparent magnitude (V): 12.25
- Apparent magnitude (B): 13.26

Characteristics
- Type: E

Other designations
- UGC 1875, MCG +07-06-014, PGC 9201

NGC 910 is an elliptical galaxy in the constellation of Andromeda. NGC 910 was discovered on October 17, 1786 by the German-British astronomer William Herschel. It is the brightest galaxy in the cluster Abell 347.

== Supernova ==
One supernova has been observed in NGC 910.

- SN 2008hs (Type Ia, mag. 17.7) was discovered by the Lick Observatory Supernova Search (LOSS) on 1 December 2008.

== See also ==
- List of NGC objects (1–1000)
