= NGC 551 =

Galaxy in the constellation Andromeda

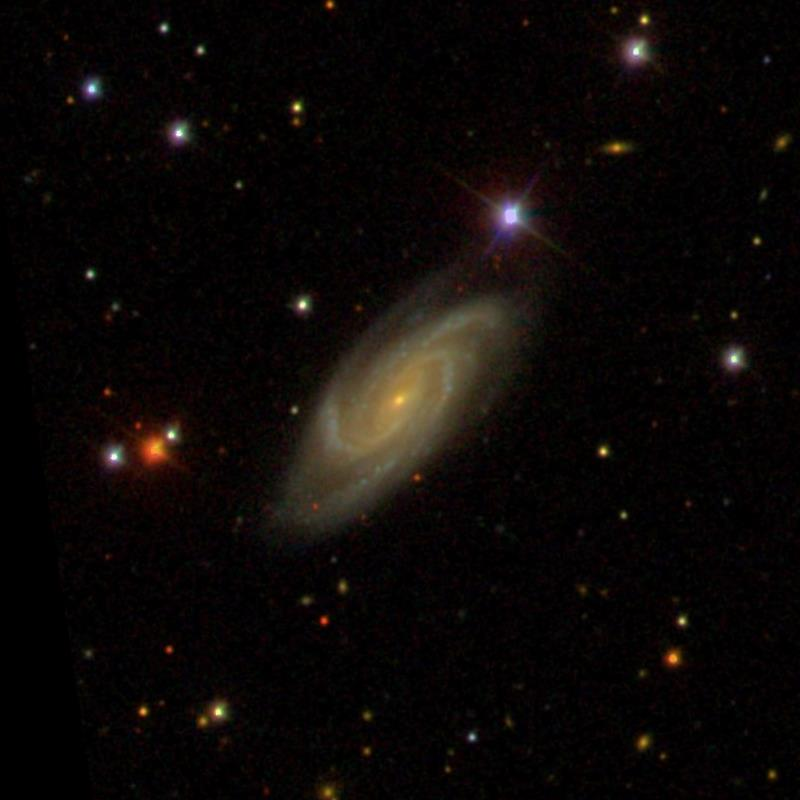
- SDSS image of NGC 551

Observation data (J2000 epoch)
- Constellation: Andromeda
- Right ascension: 01^{h} 27^{m} 40.8^{s}
- Declination: +37° 10′ 58″
- Redshift: 0.017352
- Heliocentric radial velocity: 5188 km/s
- Distance: 205 Mly (62.8 Mpc)
- Apparent magnitude (B): 12.0

Characteristics
- Type: SBbc

Other designations
- UGC 1034, MCG +06-04-027, PGC 5450

NGC 551 is a spiral galaxy in the constellation Andromeda. It is estimated to be about 205 million light-years from the Milky Way. The object was discovered on 21, September 1786 by the German-British astronomer William Herschel.

== See also ==
- List of NGC objects (1–1000)
