= NGC 624 =

Galaxy in the constellation Cetus

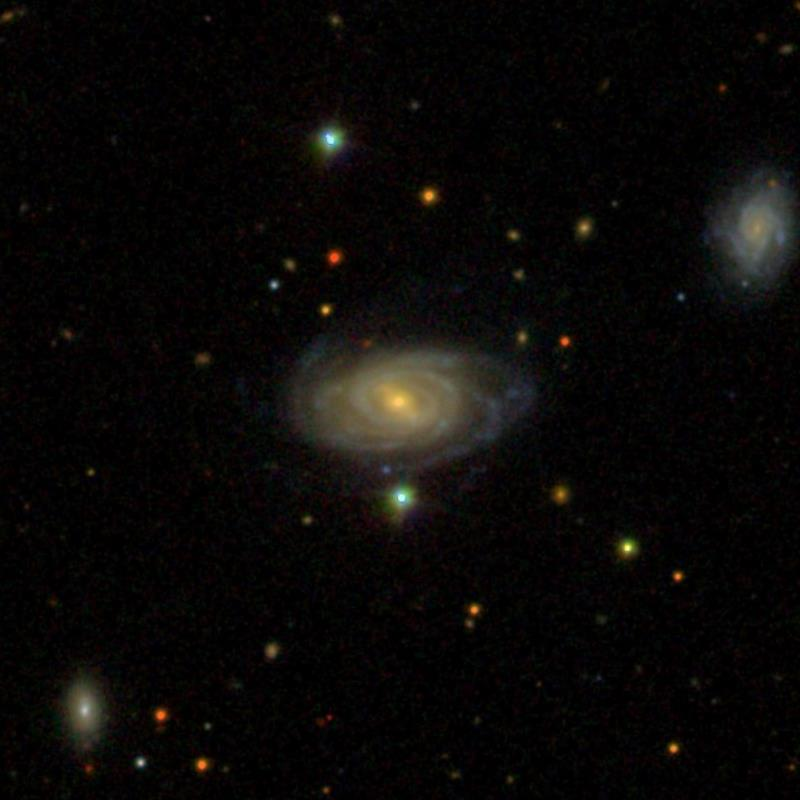
- SDSS image of NGC 624

Observation data (J2000 epoch)
- Constellation: Cetus
- Right ascension: 01^{h} 35^{m} 51.084^{s}
- Declination: −10° 00′ 10.72″
- Redshift: 0.019789
- Heliocentric radial velocity: 5873.9 km/s
- Distance: 273.8 Mly (83.95 Mpc)
- Apparent magnitude (B): 14.2

Characteristics
- Type: (R')SB(r)b pec

Other designations
- MCG -02-05-010, PGC 5932

NGC 624 is a barred spiral galaxy in the constellation of Cetus, which is about 264 million light years from the Milky Way. It was discovered on November 28, 1785, by the German-British astronomer William Herschel.

== See also ==
- List of NGC objects (1–1000)
