= NGC 850 =

Lenticular galaxy in the constellation Cetus

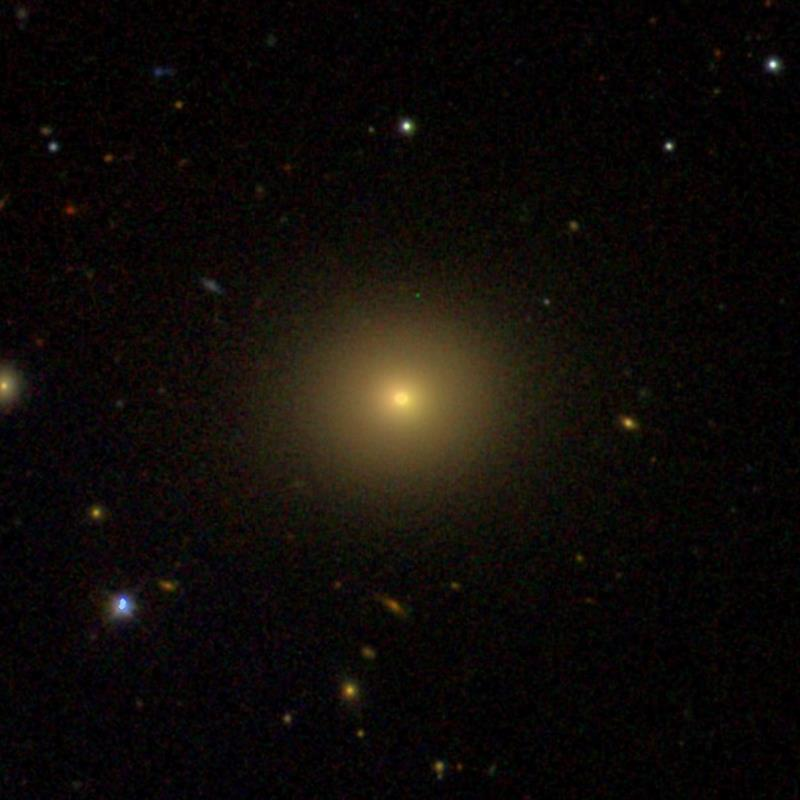
- SDSS image of NGC 850

Observation data (J2000 epoch)
- Constellation: Cetus
- Right ascension: 02^{h} 11^{m} 13.661^{s}
- Declination: −01° 29′ 08.10″
- Redshift: 0.027226
- Heliocentric radial velocity: 8051 km/s
- Distance: 305.8 Mly (93.76 Mpc)
- Apparent magnitude (B): 14.1

Characteristics
- Type: SAB0^{+}(s)

Other designations
- UGC 1679, MCG +00-06-049, PGC 8369

NGC 850 is a lenticular galaxy in the constellation Cetus. It is estimated to be 300 million light-years from the Milky Way and has a diameter of approximately 130,000 ly.

== See also ==
- List of NGC objects (1–1000)
