= NGC 980 =

Galaxy in the constellation Andromeda

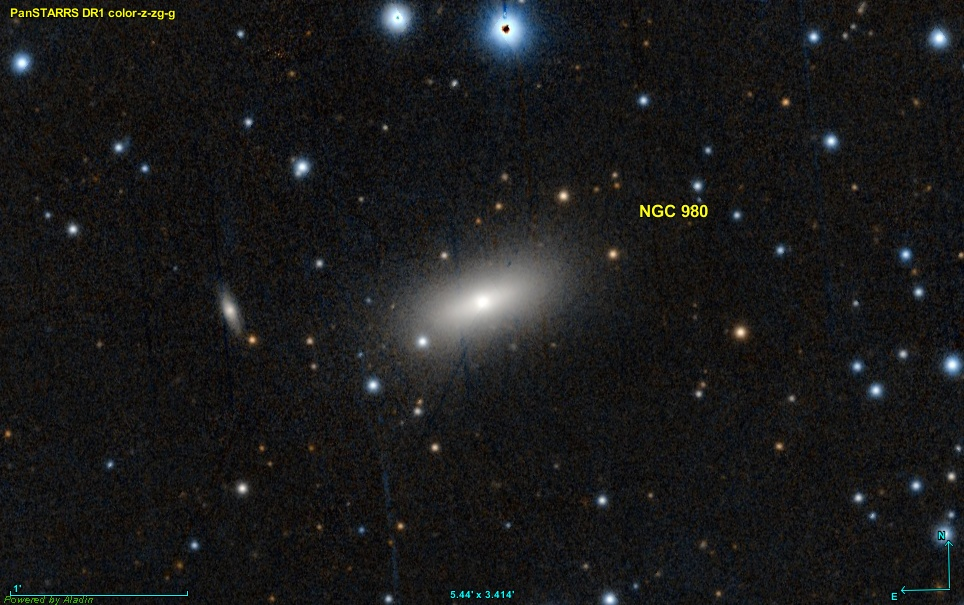
- Pan-STARRS image of NGC 980

Observation data (J2000 epoch)
- Constellation: Andromeda
- Right ascension: 02^{h} 35^{m} 18.56844^{s}
- Declination: +40° 55′ 35.3546″
- Redshift: 0.019310
- Heliocentric radial velocity: 5733 km/s
- Distance: 256.2 Mly (78.56 Mpc)
- Apparent magnitude (B): 14.3

Characteristics
- Type: S0

Other designations
- UGC 2063, MCG +07-06-038, PGC 9831

NGC 980 is a lenticular galaxy located in the constellation Andromeda about 256 million light years from the Milky Way. It was discovered by the German - British astronomer William Herschel in 1786.

iPTF 13ebh, a type Ia supernova, occurred in NGC 980.
