= NGC 324 =

Galaxy in the constellation Phoenix

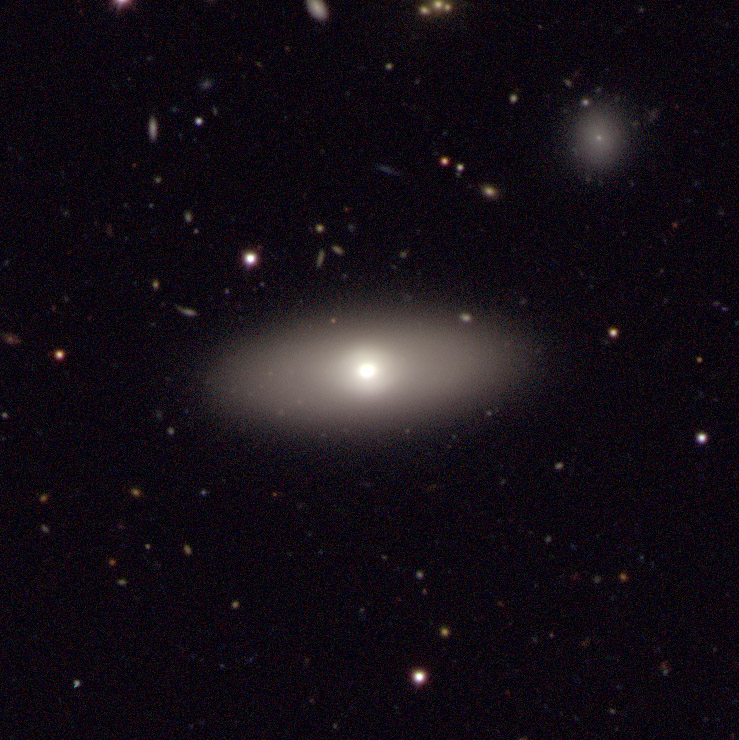
- NGC 324 with DECam. The galaxy at the upper right is LEDA 199970.

Observation data (J2000 epoch)
- Constellation: Phoenix
- Right ascension: 00^{h} 57^{m} 14.8^{s}
- Declination: −40° 57′ 33″
- Redshift: 0.011515
- Heliocentric radial velocity: 3,452 km/s
- Apparent magnitude (V): 13.99

Characteristics
- Type: S0
- Apparent size (V): 1.20' × 0.48'

Other designations
- ESO 295- G 025, MCG -07-03-002, 2MASX J00571478-4057329, ESO-LV 2950250, 6dF J0057148-405733, PGC 3416.

NGC 324 is a lenticular galaxy located in the constellation Phoenix. It was discovered on October 23, 1835, by John Herschel. It was described by Dreyer as "questionable, faint, small, stellar".
