= NGC 461 =

Galaxy in the constellation of Sculptor

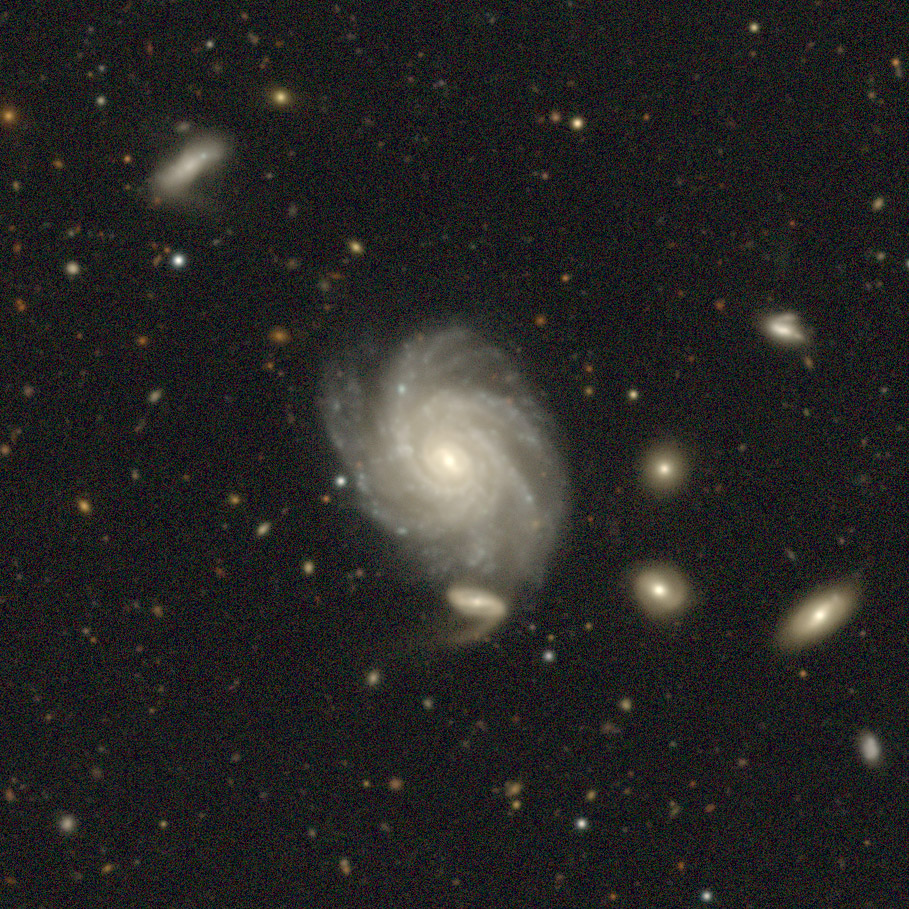
- NGC 461 as seen by DECam

Observation data (J2000 epoch)
- Constellation: Sculptor
- Right ascension: 01^{h} 17^{m} 20.6^{s}
- Declination: −33° 50′ 27″
- Redshift: 0.018936
- Heliocentric radial velocity: 5,677 km/s
- Distance: 216.21 ± 22.21 Mly (66.289 ± 6.811 Mpc)
- Apparent magnitude (V): 14.08
- Absolute magnitude (V): -21.72

Characteristics
- Type: SAB(s)c
- Apparent size (V): 1.2' × 0.9'

Other designations
- ESO 352- G 033, MCG -06-04-002, 2MASXi J0117206-335027, IRAS 01150-3406, ESO-LV 3520330, 6dF J0117206-335027, PGC 4636.

NGC 461 is an intermediate spiral galaxy of type SAB(s)c located in the constellation Sculptor. It was discovered on September 25, 1834 by John Herschel. It was described by Dreyer as "pretty bright, round, gradually a little brighter middle (perhaps 1° wrong?)."
