= NGC 365 =

Barred spiral galaxy in the constellation of Sculptor

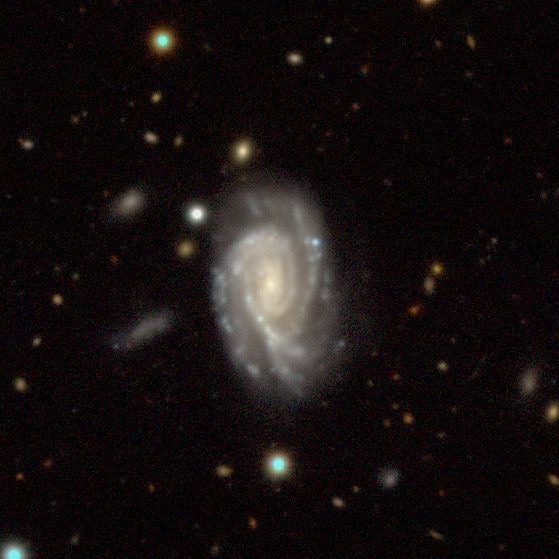
- NGC 365 with DECam

Observation data (J2000 epoch)
- Constellation: Sculptor
- Right ascension: 01^{h} 04^{m} 18.7461^{s}
- Declination: −35° 07′ 17.102″
- Redshift: 0.033196
- Heliocentric radial velocity: 9,952 km/s
- Apparent magnitude (V): 14.21

Characteristics
- Type: SBbc
- Apparent size (V): 0.93' × 0.56'

Other designations
- ESO 352- G 001, MCG -06-03-017, 2MASX J01041872-3507171, 2MASXi J0104187-350717, IRAS 01019-3523, F01019-3523, ESO-LV 3520010, 6dF J0104187-350717, PGC 3822.

NGC 365 is a barred spiral galaxy in the constellation Sculptor. It was discovered on November 25, 1834, by John Herschel. It was described by Dreyer as "faint, small, round, gradually a little brighter middle."

One supernova has been observed in NGC 365: SN 1970N (type unknown, mag. 18.8) was discovered by Steven van Agt on 4 August 1970.

== See also ==
- List of NGC objects (1–1000)
