= NGC 341 =

Galaxy in the constellation Cetus

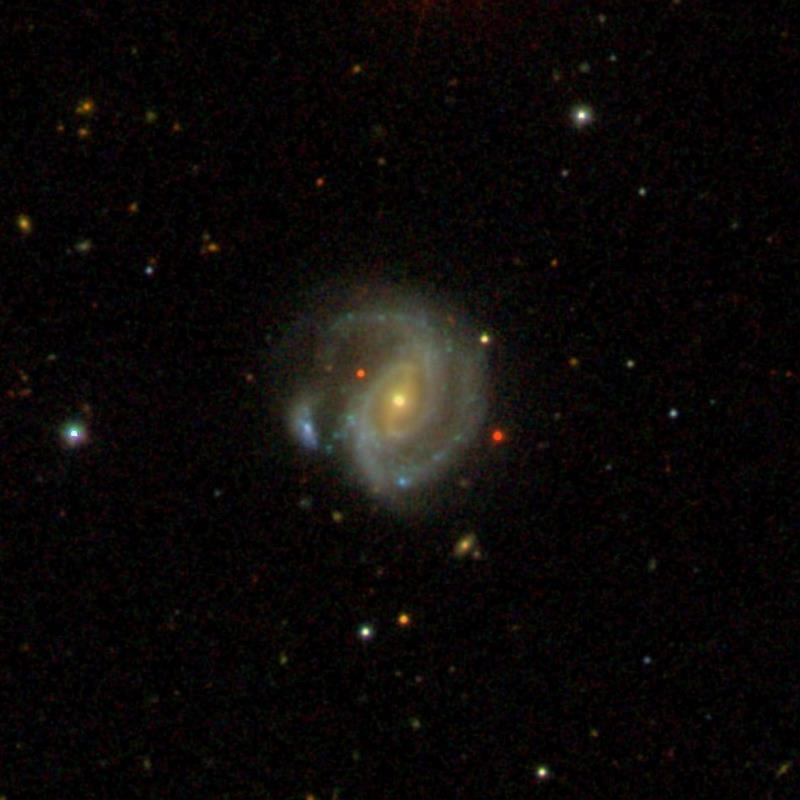
- SDSS image of NGC 341

Observation data (J2000 epoch)
- Constellation: Cetus
- Right ascension: 01^{h} 00^{m} 45.8^{s}
- Declination: −09° 11′ 09″
- Redshift: 0.015187
- Heliocentric radial velocity: 4,553 km/s<
- Apparent magnitude (V): 13.7g

Characteristics
- Type: SAB(r)bc
- Apparent size (V): 1.21' × 1.00'

Other designations
- Arp 59; MRK 968; MCG -02-03-063; 2MASX J01004581-0911087; 6dF J0100457-091109; PGC 3620

NGC 341 is a spiral galaxy in the constellation Cetus. It was discovered on October 21, 1881 by Édouard Stephan. It was described by Dreyer as "faint, pretty large, round, a little brighter middle, mottled but not resolved." It has a companion galaxy, PGC 3627, which is sometimes called NGC 341B. For this reason, it has been included in Halton Arp's Atlas of Peculiar Galaxies.

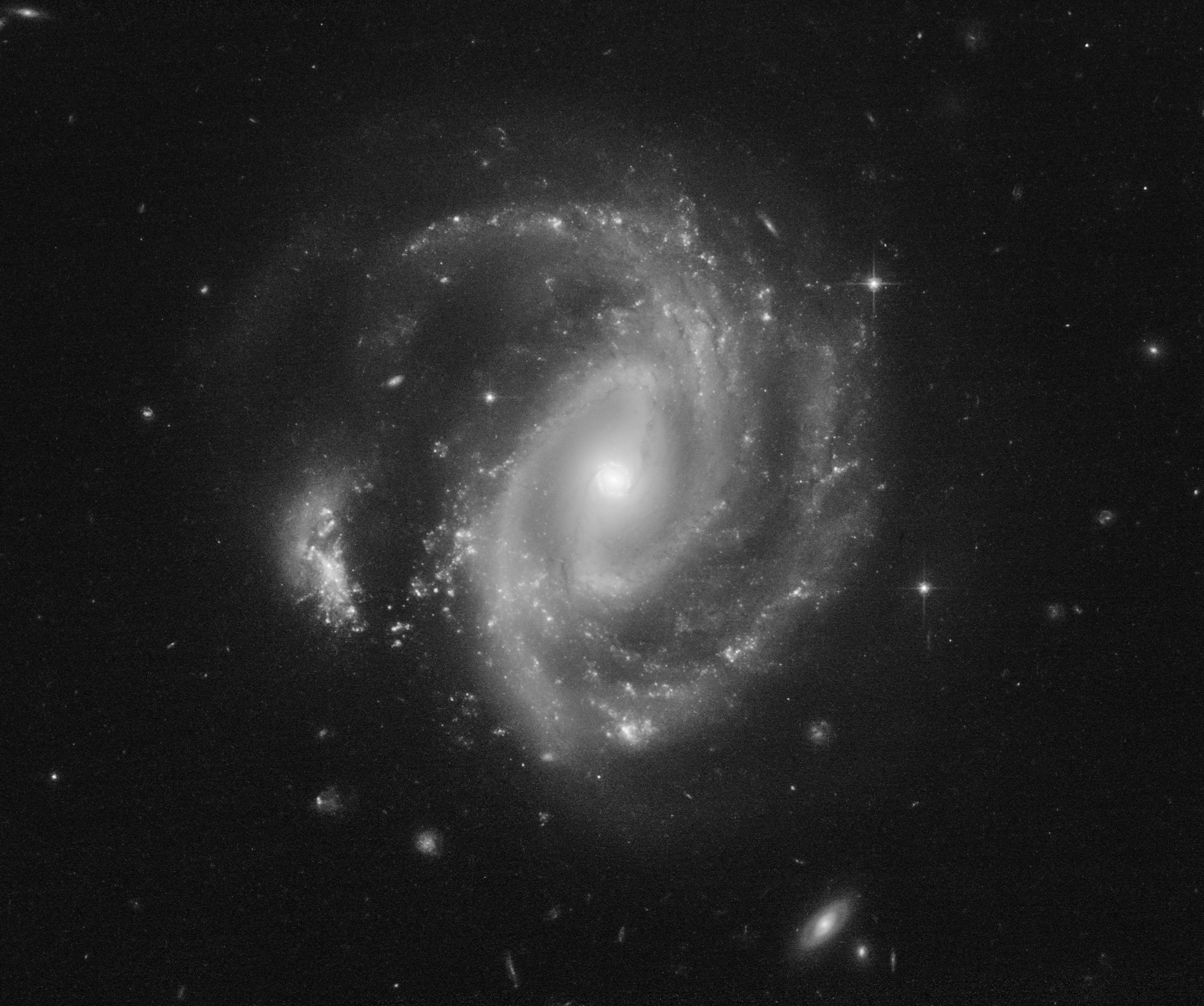
Hubble Space Telescope image of NGC 341 (Arp 59)
