= NGC 413 =

Spiral galaxy in the constellation Cetus

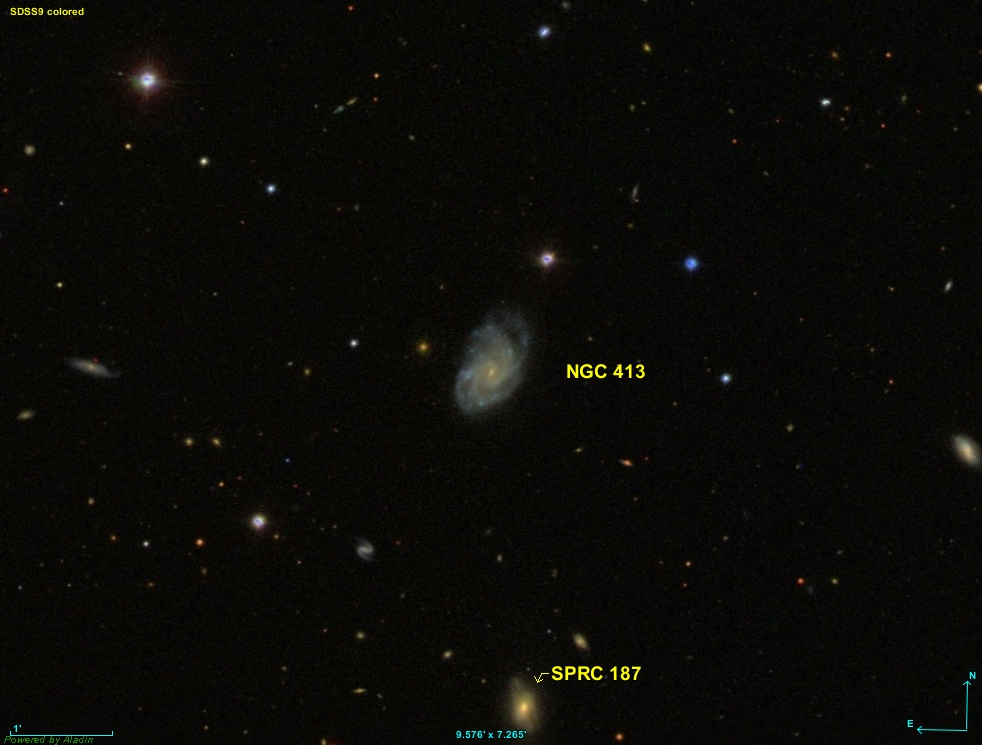
- NGC 413 as seen by the SDSS

Observation data (J2000 epoch)
- Constellation: Cetus
- Right ascension: 01^{h} 12^{m} 31.4^{s}
- Declination: −02° 47′ 36″
- Redshift: 0.019403
- Heliocentric radial velocity: 5,817 km/s
- Distance: 235.00 ± 32.98 Mly (72.050 ± 10.112 Mpc)
- Apparent magnitude (V): 15.06
- Absolute magnitude (V): -21.36

Characteristics
- Type: SB(r)c
- Apparent size (V): 1.1' × 0.7'

Other designations
- MCG -01-04-013, 2MASX J01123140-0247361, 6dF J0112313-024736, PGC 4347.

NGC 413 is a spiral galaxy of type SB(r)c located in the constellation Cetus. It was discovered in 1886 by Francis Leavenworth. It was described by Dreyer as "extremely faint, pretty small, very little extended."

== Image gallery ==
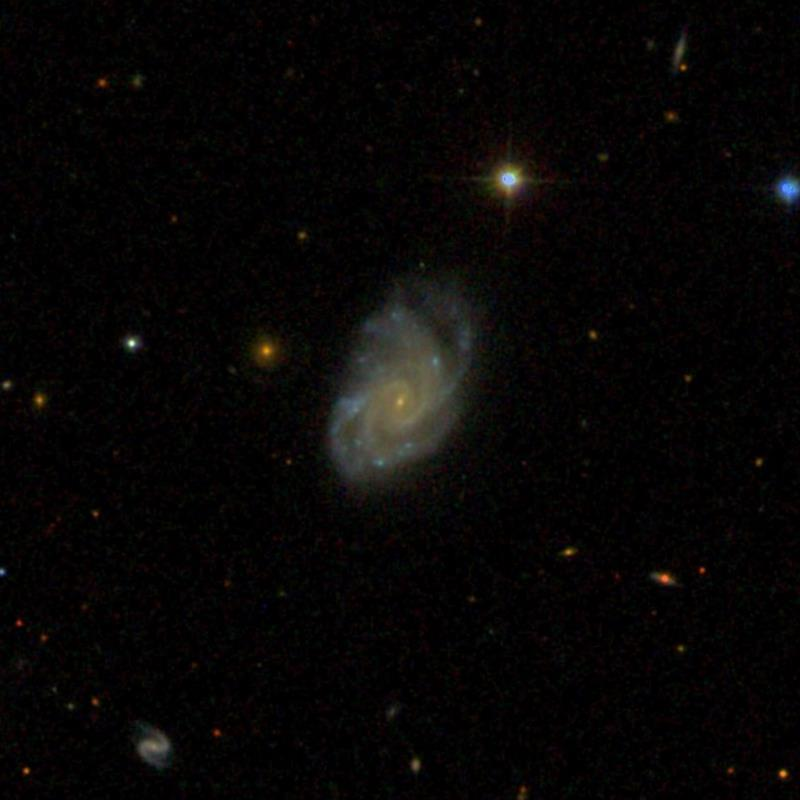
NGC 413 (SDSS)

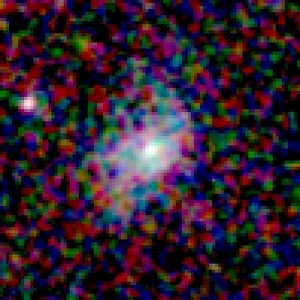
2MASS image of NGC 413

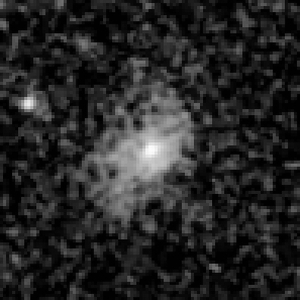
NGC 413 (2MASS BW)
