= NGC 448 =

Lenticular galaxy in the constellation Cetus

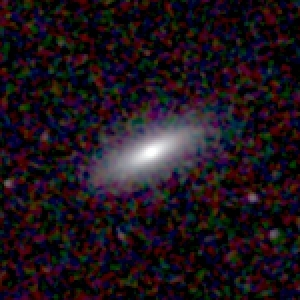
- NGC 448 as seen by 2MASS

Observation data (J2000 epoch)
- Constellation: Cetus
- Right ascension: 01^{h} 15^{m} 16.5^{s}
- Declination: −01° 37′ 34″
- Redshift: 0.006364
- Heliocentric radial velocity: 1,908 km/s
- Distance: 88.45 ± 23.63 Mly (27.120 ± 7.246 Mpc)
- Apparent magnitude (V): 13.14
- Absolute magnitude (V): -19.28

Characteristics
- Type: S0^- (edge-on)
- Apparent size (V): 1.6' × 0.8'

Other designations
- UGC 00801, CGCG 385-051, MCG +00-04-060, 2MASX J01151653-0137339, 2MASXi J0115165-013734, 6dF J0115165-013734, 6dFGSv 00698,PGC 4524.

NGC 448 is a lenticular galaxy of type S0 (edge-on) located approximately 88.45 ± 23.63 Mly (27.120 ± 7.246 Mpc) away in the constellation Cetus. It was discovered on September 2, 1886 by Lewis Swift. It was described by Dreyer as "pretty bright, very small, [and] a little extended."

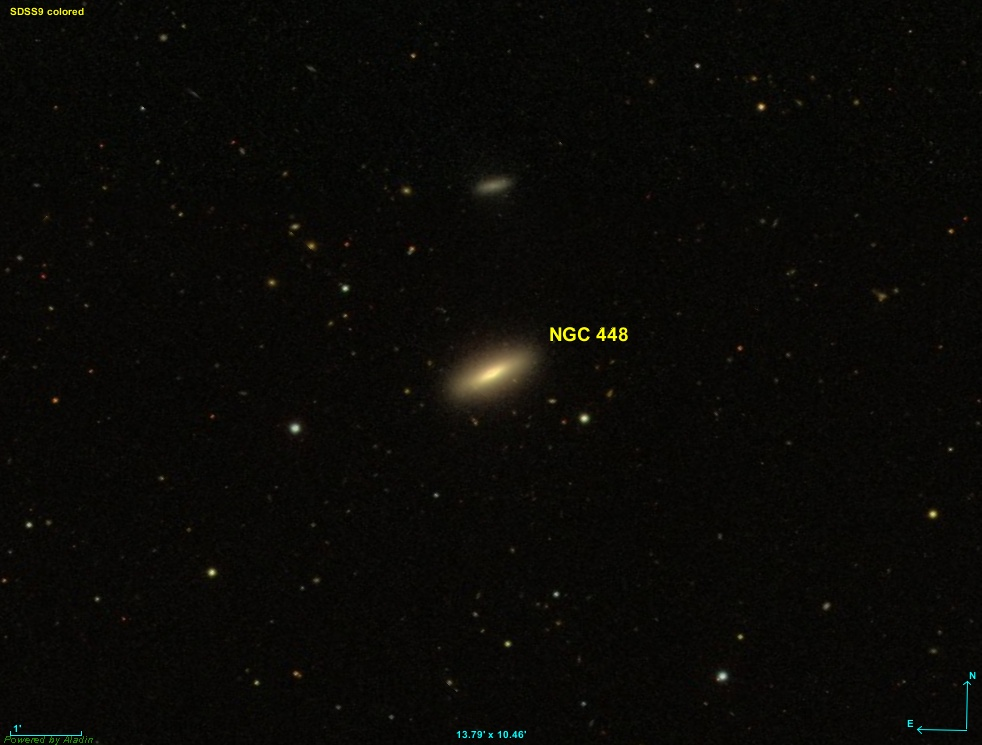
NGC 448 (SDSS)
