= NGC 348 =

Galaxy in the constellation Phoenix

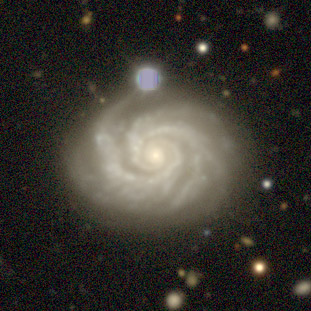
- NGC 348 with DECam

Observation data (J2000 epoch)
- Constellation: Phoenix
- Right ascension: 01^{h} 00^{m} 52.0^{s}
- Declination: −53° 14′ 40″
- Redshift: 0.029477
- Heliocentric radial velocity: 8,837 km/s
- Apparent magnitude (V): 14.54

Characteristics
- Type: Sb
- Apparent size (V): 0.78' × 0.73'

Other designations
- ESO 151- G 017, 2MASX J01005202-5314402, ESO-LV 1510170, 6dF J0100520-531440, PGC 3632.

NGC 348 is a spiral galaxy in the constellation Phoenix. It was discovered on October 3, 1834 by John Herschel. It was described by Dreyer as "extremely faint, small, round."
