= NGC 418 =

Galaxy in the constellation of Sculptor

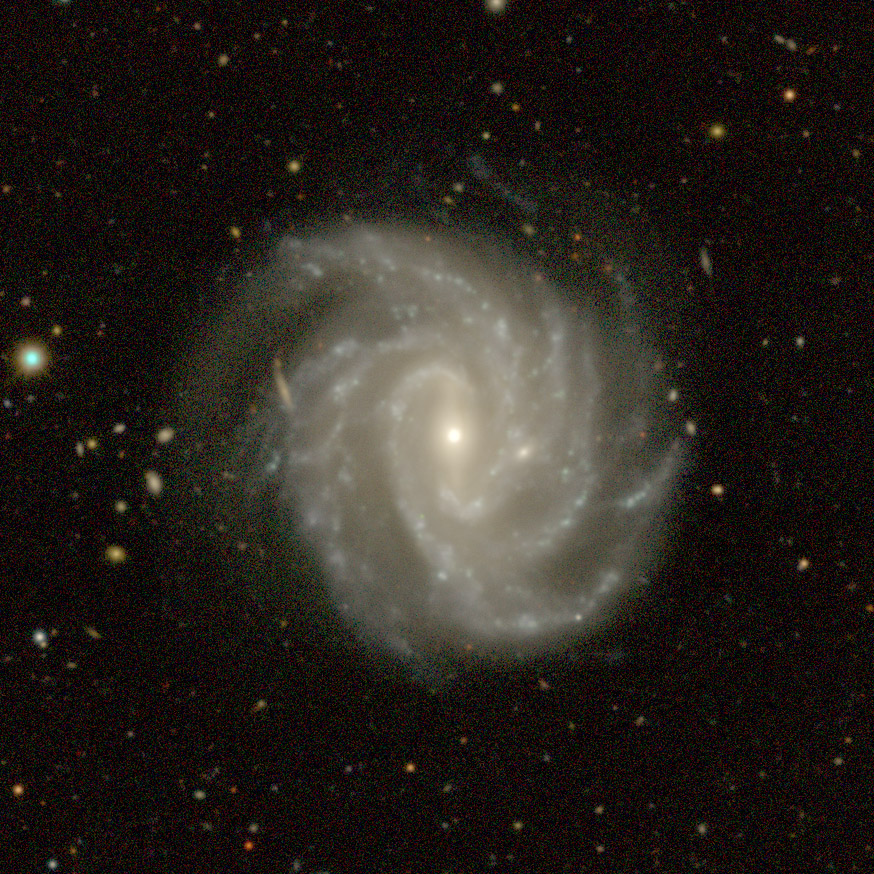
- NGC 418 as seen by DECam

Observation data (J2000 epoch)
- Constellation: Sculptor
- Right ascension: 01^{h} 10^{m} 35.6^{s}
- Declination: −30° 13′ 17″
- Redshift: 0.019036
- Heliocentric radial velocity: 5,707 km/s
- Distance: 199.04 ± 27.66 Mly (61.025 ± 8.480 Mpc)
- Apparent magnitude (V): 13.12
- Absolute magnitude (V): -21.89

Characteristics
- Type: SB(s)c
- Apparent size (V): 2.0' × 1.7'

Other designations
- ESO 412- G 009, MCG -05-04-002, 2MASX J01103561-3013165, 2MASXi J0110356-301310, IRAS 01082-3029, F01082-3029, ESO-LV 4120090, 6dF J0110355-301317, PGC 4189.

NGC 418 is a barred spiral galaxy of type SB(s)c located in the constellation Sculptor. It was discovered on September 28, 1834 by British astronomer John Herschel. It was described by Dreyer as "faint, pretty large, round, very gradually a little brighter middle, western of 2.", the other being NGC 423.

== Supernova ==
One supernova has been observed in NGC 418:

- SN 2014co (Type II, mag. 16.8) was discovered by Berto Monard on 21 June 2014.
