= NGC 377 =

Galaxy in the constellation Cetus

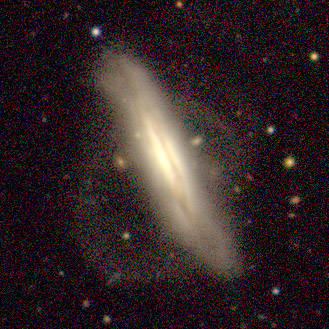
- DECam image of NGC 377

Observation data (J2000 epoch)
- Constellation: Cetus
- Right ascension: 01^{h} 06^{m} 34.8^{s}
- Declination: −20° 19′ 57″
- Redshift: 0.053540
- Heliocentric radial velocity: 16,051 km/s
- Apparent magnitude (V): 16.19

Characteristics
- Type: Sc
- Apparent size (V): 1.2' × 0.3'

Other designations
- ESO 541- G 019, MCG +05-03-048, IRAS F01041-2036, ESO-LV 5410190, 6dF J0106351-201956, PGC 3931.

NGC 377 is a spiral galaxy located in the constellation Cetus. It was discovered on October 15, 1885, by Francis Leavenworth. It was described by Dreyer as "very faint, very small, much extended, suddenly brighter middle and nucleus."
