= NGC 415 =

Spiral galaxy in the constellation of Sculptor

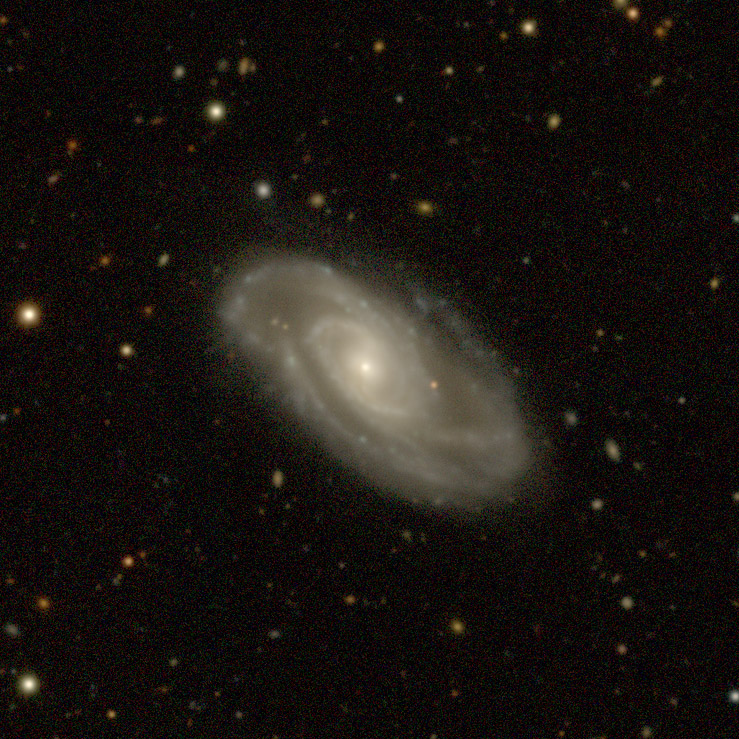
- NGC 415 as seen by DECam

Observation data (J2000 epoch)
- Constellation: Sculptor
- Right ascension: 01^{h} 10^{m} 05.7^{s}
- Declination: −35° 29′ 27″
- Redshift: 0.021655
- Heliocentric radial velocity: 6,492 km/s
- Distance: 279.37 ± 35.68 Mly (85.654 ± 10.939 Mpc)
- Apparent magnitude (V): 14.28
- Absolute magnitude (V): -18.00

Characteristics
- Type: SB(rs)b
- Apparent size (V): 1.4' × 0.8'

Other designations
- ESO 352- G 014, MCG -06-03-024, 2MASX J01100570-3529265, 2MASXi J0110057-352927, IRAS F01077-3545, ESO-LV 3520140, 6dF J0110056-352927, PGC 4161.

NGC 415 is a spiral galaxy of type SB(rb)b located in the constellation Sculptor. It was discovered on September 1, 1834, by John Herschel. It was described by Dreyer as "very faint, small, round, gradually a little brighter middle."
