= NGC 363 =

Lenticular galaxy in the constellation Cetus

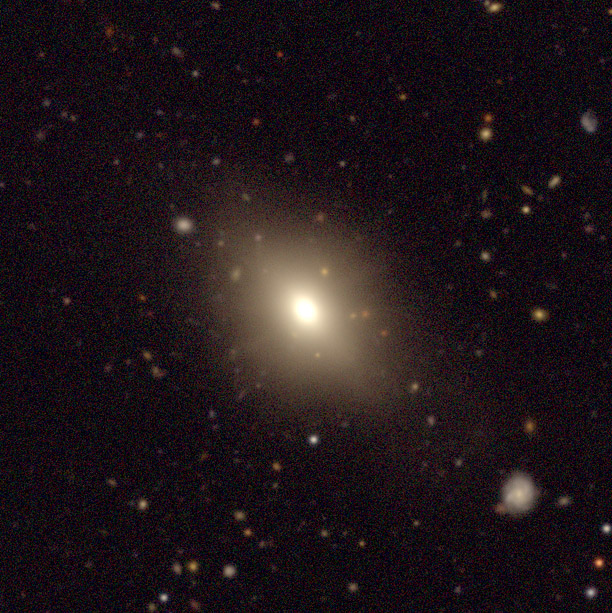
- DECam image of NGC 363

Observation data (J2000 epoch)
- Constellation: Cetus
- Right ascension: 01^{h} 06^{m} 15.8^{s}
- Declination: −16° 32′ 34″
- Redshift: 0.037499
- Heliocentric radial velocity: 11,242 km/s
- Distance: 417 million ly (128 mpc)
- Apparent magnitude (V): 15.35

Characteristics
- Type: S0
- Apparent size (V): 0.25' × 0.25'

Other designations
- MCG -03-03-023, 2MASX J01061580-1632343, 2MASXi J0106158-163233, 6dF J0106158-163234, PGC 3911.

NGC 363 is a lenticular galaxy in the constellation Cetus. It was discovered on November 28, 1885 by Francis Leavenworth. It was described by Dreyer as "extremely faint, extremely small, round."
