= NGC 174 =

Barred spiral or lenticular galaxy in Sculptor

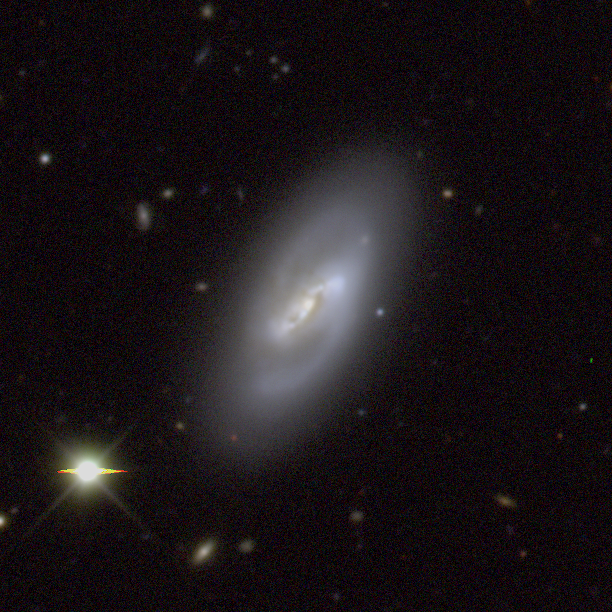
- NGC 174 as seen by DECam

Observation data (J2000 epoch)
- Constellation: Sculptor
- Right ascension: 00^{h} 36^{m} 58.9^{s}
- Declination: −29° 28′ 40″
- Redshift: 0.011905
- Distance: 159 Mly
- Apparent magnitude (V): 13.62

Characteristics
- Type: SB0/a?(rs)
- Apparent size (V): 1.4' × 0.6'

Other designations
- ESO 411- G 001, ESO-LV 4110010, 6dF J0036589-292840, IRAS 00345-2945, IRAS F00345-2945, 2MASX J00365892-2928403, 2MASXi J0036589-292840, MCG -05-02-028, PGC 2206

NGC 174 is a barred spiral or lenticular galaxy around 159 million light-years away in the constellation Sculptor. It was discovered on 27 September 1834 by astronomer John Herschel.

== Observation history ==
When Herschel discovered the galaxy, he logged "faint, small, little extended, among several bright stars". After a second and third sweep, he noted an exact position which matches PGC 2206. As of such, the two objects are generally referred to as the same. The galaxy was later catalogued by John Louis Emil Dreyer in the New General Catalogue, where Herschel's original note was largely adopted, as the object was described as "extremely faint, small, very little extended, among bright stars".

== Description ==
The galaxy appears very dim in the sky as it only has an apparent visual magnitude of approximately 14 and thus can only be observed with telescopes. It can be classified as type G using the Hubble Sequence. The object's distance of roughly 159 million light-years from the Solar System can be estimated using its redshift and Hubble's law.

== See also ==
- List of NGC objects (1–1000)
