= NGC 355 =

Galaxy in the constellation Cetus

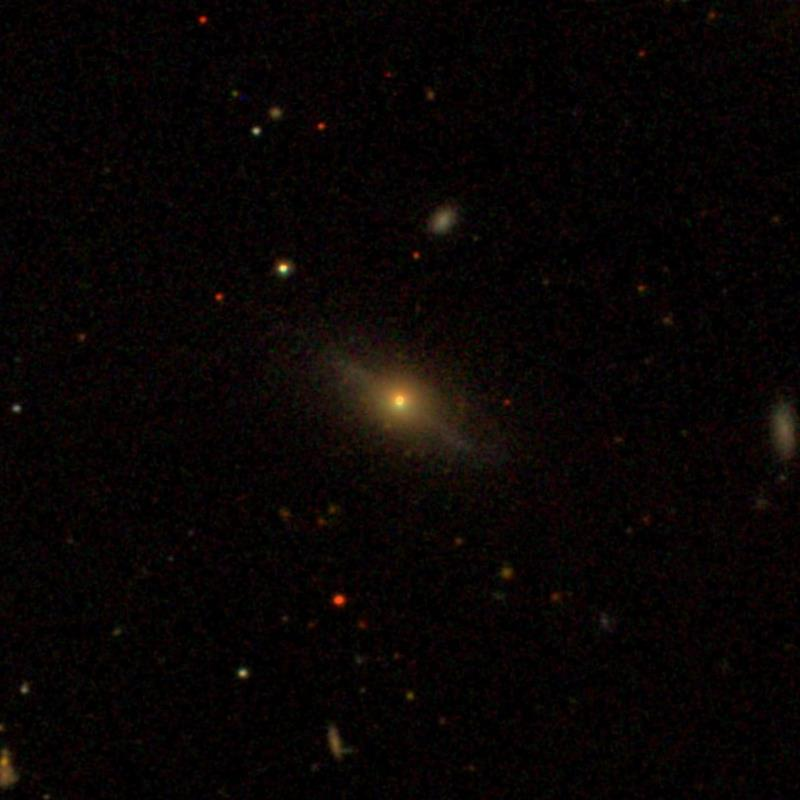
- SDSS image of NGC 355

Observation data (J2000 epoch)
- Constellation: Cetus
- Right ascension: 01^{h} 03^{m} 07.0^{s}
- Declination: −06° 19′ 26″
- Redshift: 0.024217
- Heliocentric radial velocity: 7,260 km/s
- Apparent magnitude (V): 16.0b

Characteristics
- Type: SB0
- Apparent size (V): 1.0' × 0.4'

Other designations
- MCG -01-03-077, 2MASX J01030695-0619252, 2MASXi J0103069-061925, 6dF J0103070-061926, PGC 3753.

NGC 355 is a lenticular galaxy in the constellation Cetus. It was discovered on September 27, 1864, by Albert Marth. It was described by Dreyer as "extremely faint, very small."

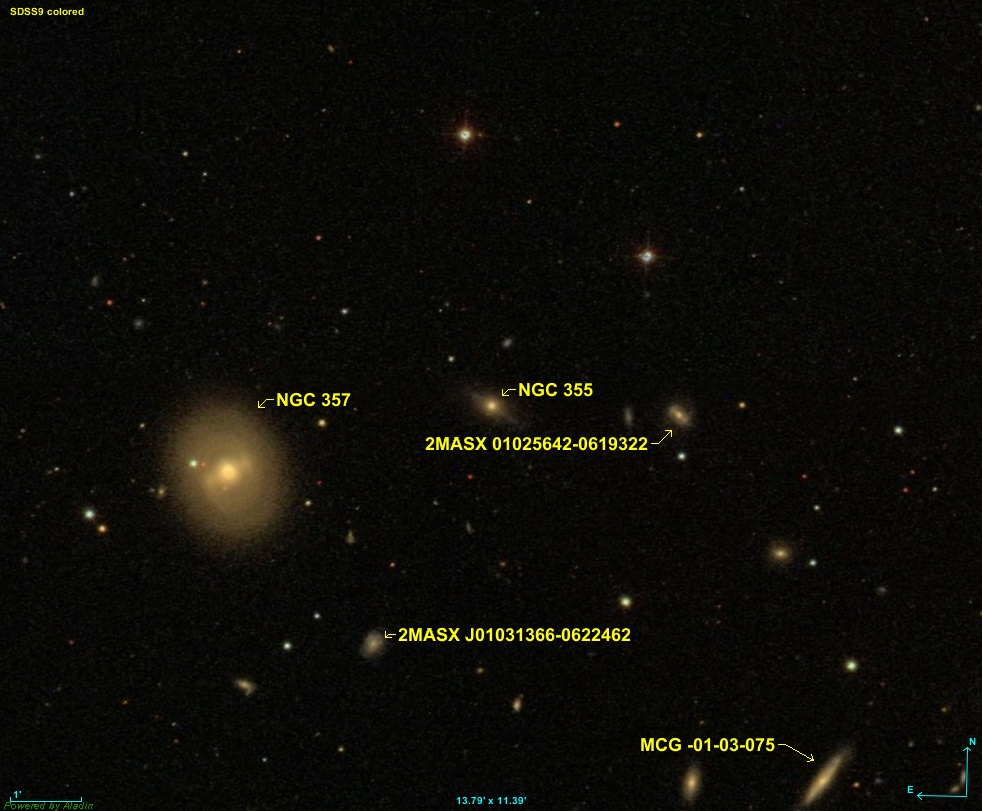
NGC 355 with the other galaxies (SDSS)
