= NGC 340 =

Spiral galaxy in the constellation Cetus

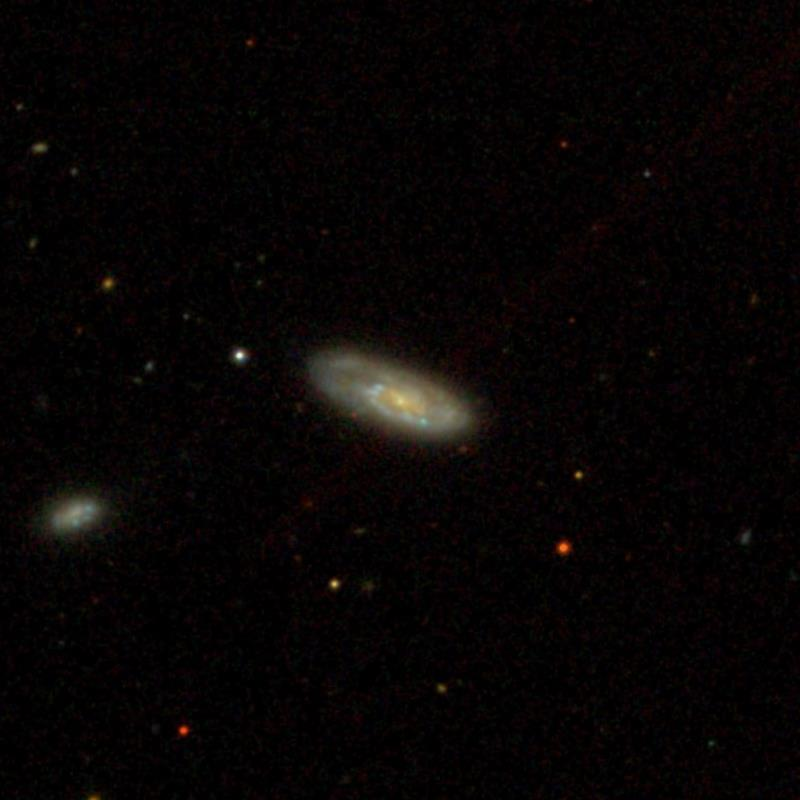
- SDSS image of NGC 340

Observation data (J2000 epoch)
- Constellation: Cetus
- Right ascension: 01^{h} 00^{m} 34.9^{s}
- Declination: −06° 52′ 00″
- Redshift: 0.020372
- Heliocentric radial velocity: 6,107 km/s
- Apparent magnitude (V): 14.51

Characteristics
- Type: S
- Apparent size (V): 0.9' × 0.3'

Other designations
- MCG -01-03-055, 2MASX J01003488-0651597, 2MASXi J0100348-065159, IRAS 00580-0708, 6dF J0100349-065200, PGC 3610.

NGC 340 is a spiral galaxy in the constellation Cetus. It was discovered on September 27, 1864, by Albert Marth. It was described by Dreyer as "very faint, small, extended."
