= NGC 423 =

Galaxy in the constellation of Sculptor

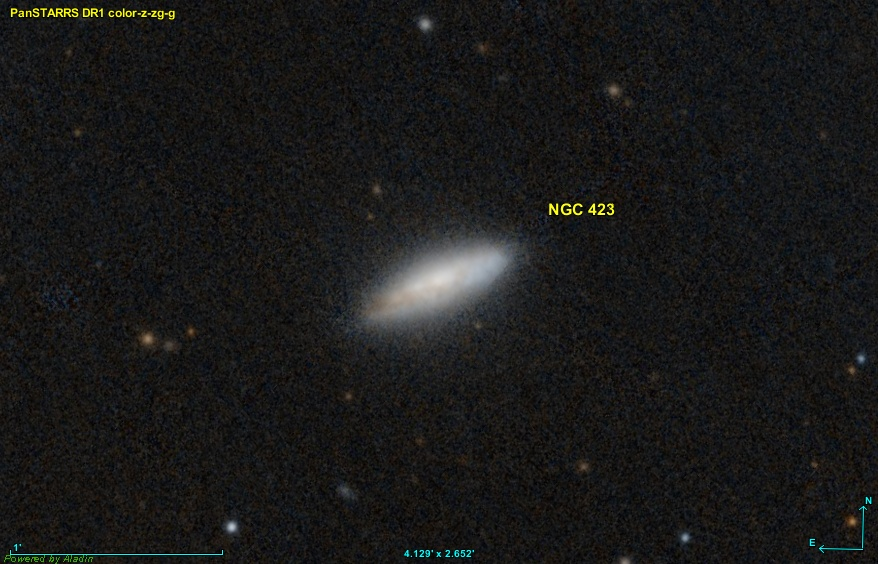
- Pan-STARRS image of NGC 423

Observation data (J2000 epoch)
- Constellation: Sculptor
- Right ascension: 01^{h} 11^{m} 22.2^{s}
- Declination: −29° 14′ 04″
- Redshift: 0.005344
- Heliocentric radial velocity: 1,602 km/s
- Apparent magnitude (V): 14.20
- Absolute magnitude (V): -18.22

Characteristics
- Type: S0/a?
- Apparent size (V): 1.0' × 0.4'

Other designations
- ESO 412- G 011, MCG -05-04-004, 2MASX J01112221-2914042, 2MASXi J0111222-291403, IRAS 01090-2929, F01090-2929, ESO-LV 4120110, 6dF J0111222-291404, PGC 4266.

NGC 423 is a lenticular galaxy of type S0/a? located in the constellation Sculptor. It was discovered on November 14, 1835 by John Herschel. It was described by Dreyer as "extremely faint, small, extended, gradually a little brighter middle, eastern of 2.", the other being NGC 418.
