= NGC 353 =

Spiral galaxy in the constellation Cetus

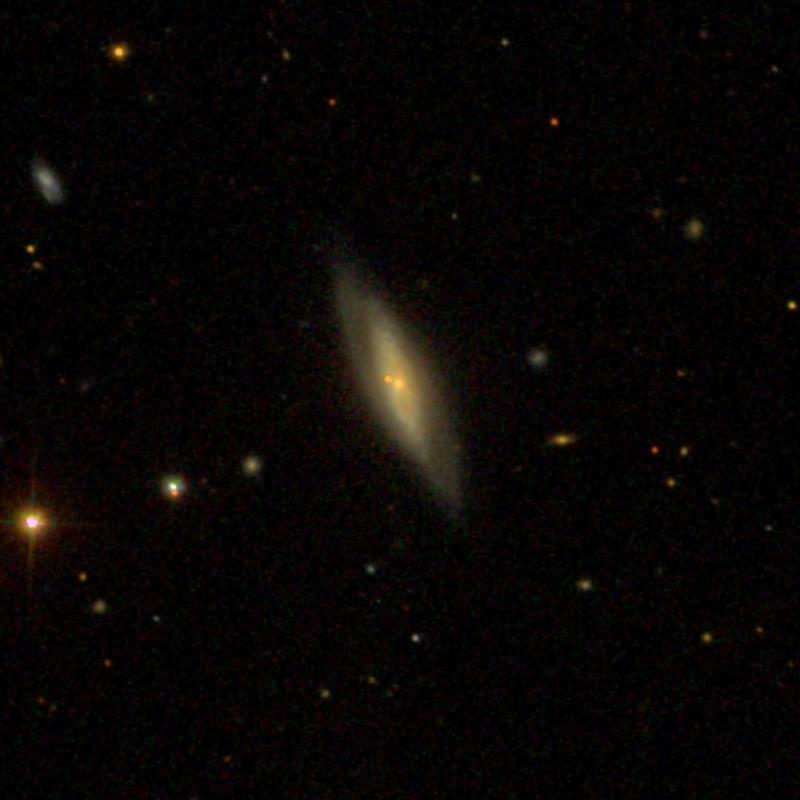
- SDSS image of NGC 353

Observation data (J2000 epoch)
- Constellation: Cetus
- Right ascension: 01^{h} 02^{m} 24.5^{s}
- Declination: −01° 57′ 32″
- Redshift: 0.013703
- Heliocentric radial velocity: 4,108 km/s
- Apparent magnitude (V): 14.55

Characteristics
- Type: SBa
- Apparent size (V): 1.3' × 0.4'

Other designations
- UGC 00641, CGCG 384-058, MCG +00-03-058, 2MASX J01022454-0157326, 2MASXi J0102245-015727, IRAS 00598-0213, F00598-0213, 6dF J0102245-015732, PGC 3714.

NGC 353 is a spiral galaxy in the constellation Cetus. It was discovered on November 10, 1885 by Lewis Swift. It was described by Dreyer as "extremely faint, pretty small, round, southeastern of 2.", the other being NGC 351.
