= NGC 334 =

Galaxy in the constellation of Sculptor

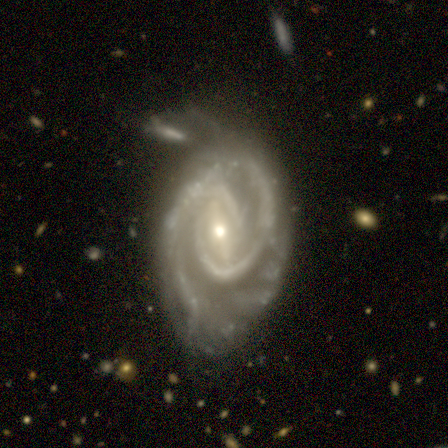
- NGC 334 with DECam

Observation data (J2000 epoch)
- Constellation: Sculptor
- Right ascension: 00^{h} 58^{m} 49.8^{s}
- Declination: −35° 06′ 58″
- Redshift: 0.030721
- Heliocentric radial velocity: 9,210 km/s
- Apparent magnitude (V): 14.47

Characteristics
- Type: S(B)b
- Apparent size (V): 1.2' × 0.6'

Other designations
- ESO 351- G 026, MCG -06-03-012, 2MASX J00584979-3506577, 2MASXi J0058497-350657, IRAS 00564-3523, F00564-3523, ESO-LV 3510260, 6dF J0058497-350658, PGC 3514.

NGC 334 is a barred spiral galaxy in the constellation Sculptor. It was discovered on September 25, 1834 by John Herschel. It was described by Dreyer as "very faint, small, round, gradually a little brighter middle, 2 stars of 11th magnitude to south."
