= NGC 360 =

Spiral galaxy in the constellation Tucana

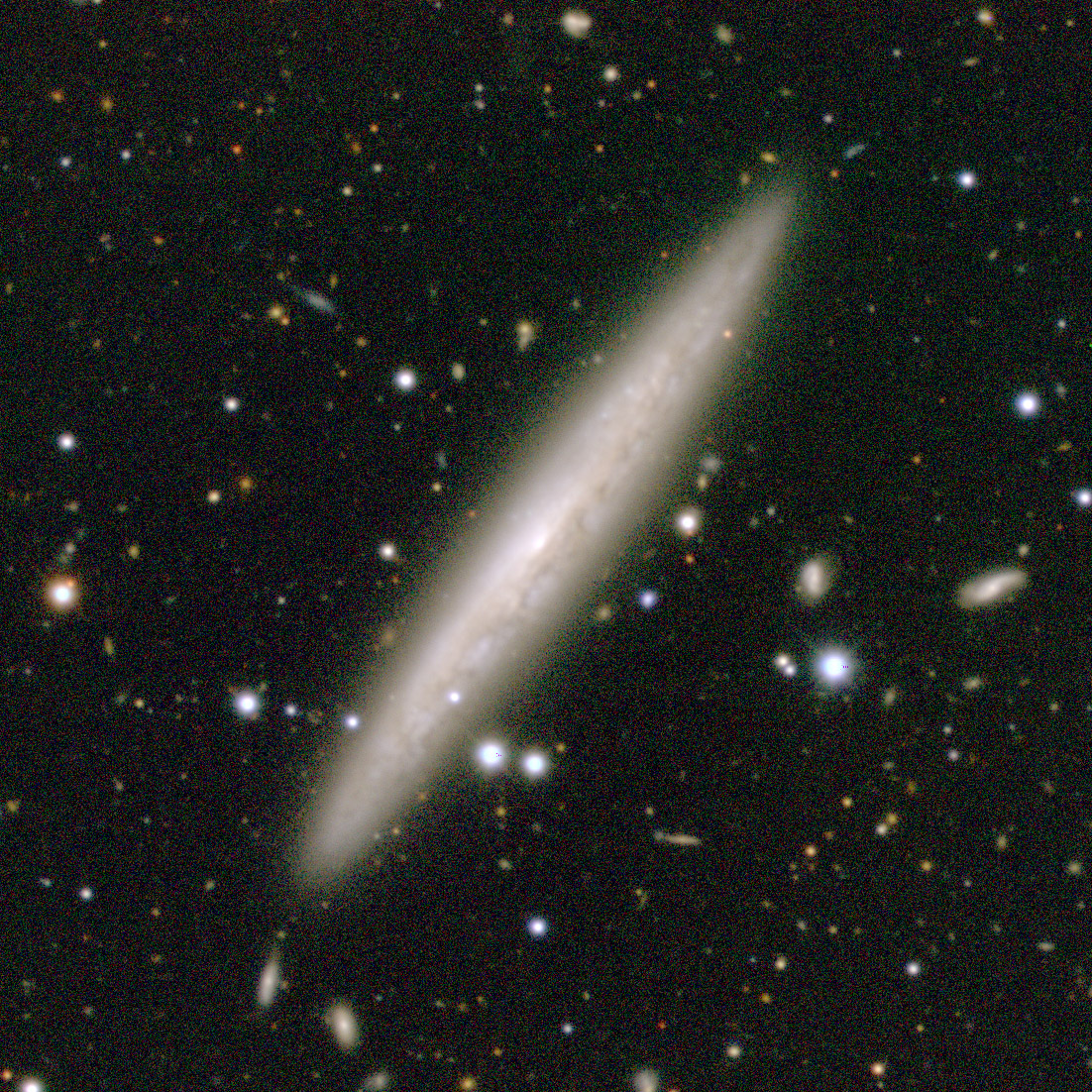
- NGC 360 as seen by DECam

Observation data (J2000 epoch)
- Constellation: Tucana
- Right ascension: 01^{h} 02^{m} 51.4^{s}
- Declination: −65° 36′ 36″
- Redshift: 0.007693
- Heliocentric radial velocity: 2,306 km/s
- Distance: 103 Mly
- Apparent magnitude (V): 13.40
- Apparent magnitude (B): 13.4

Characteristics
- Type: Sbc
- Apparent size (V): 4.03' × 0.52'

Other designations
- ESO 079- G 014, 2MASX J01025144-6536359, IRAS 01009-6552, F01009-6552, ESO-LV 0790140, 6dF J0102515-653636, PGC 3743.

NGC 360 is a spiral galaxy located approximately 103 million light-years from the Solar System in the constellation Tucana. It was discovered on 2 November 1834 by John Herschel. Dreyer, creator of the New General Catalogue described the object as "extremely faint, very much extended 145°, very little brighter middle."

== See also ==
- List of NGC objects (1–1000)

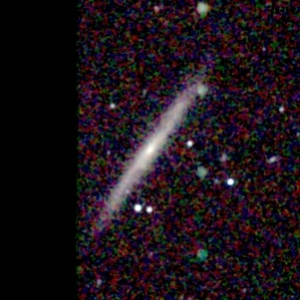
NGC 360 (2MASS)
