= NGC 429 =

Lenticular galaxy in the constellation Cetus

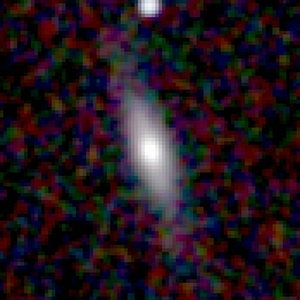
- NGC 429 as seen by 2MASS

Observation data (J2000 epoch)
- Constellation: Cetus
- Right ascension: 01^{h} 12^{m} 57.4^{s}
- Declination: −00° 20′ 42″
- Redshift: 0.018763
- Heliocentric radial velocity: 5,625 km/s
- Distance: 304.96 Mly (93.500 Mpc)
- Apparent magnitude (V): 14.3g
- Absolute magnitude (V): -22.25

Characteristics
- Type: S0^0:
- Apparent size (V): 1.52' × 0.35'

Other designations
- UGC 00762, CGCG 385-027, MCG +00-04-037, 2MASX J01125745-0020416, 2MASXi J0112572-002045, 6dF J0112574-002042, 6dFGSv 00673, PGC 4368.

NGC 429 is a lenticular galaxy of type S0^0: located in the constellation Cetus. It was discovered on December 20, 1786 by William Herschel. It was described by Dreyer as "very faint, very small."

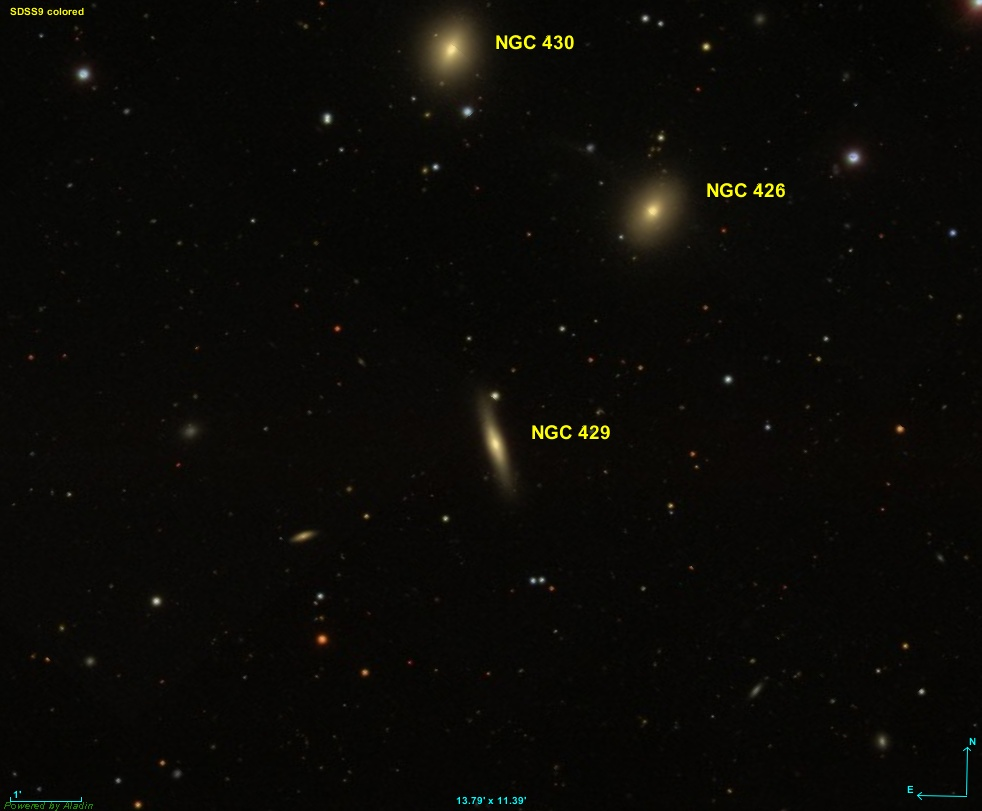
NGC 429 (SDSS)
