= NGC 331 =

Galaxy of the constellation Cetus

PGC 2759

Observation data (J2000 epoch)
- Constellation: Cetus
- Right ascension: 00^{h} 47^{m} 06.8^{s}
- Declination: −02° 43′ 52″
- Redshift: 0.023813
- Heliocentric radial velocity: 7,139 km/s
- Apparent magnitude (V): 15.19

Characteristics
- Type: Sc
- Apparent size (V): 0.8' × 0.5'

Other designations
- MCG -01-03-012, 2MASX J00470684-0243526, 2MASXi J0047068-024351, 6dF J0047069-024353, PGC 2759.

NGC 331 is a barred spiral galaxy in the constellation Cetus. It was discovered in 1886 by Francis Leavenworth. It was described by Dreyer as "extremely faint, very small, round, a little brighter middle, 12th magnitude star 3 arcmin northeast." There are two candidates as to which object is NGC 331: PGC 2759 or PGC 3406, with the former being a much more likely candidate than the latter.

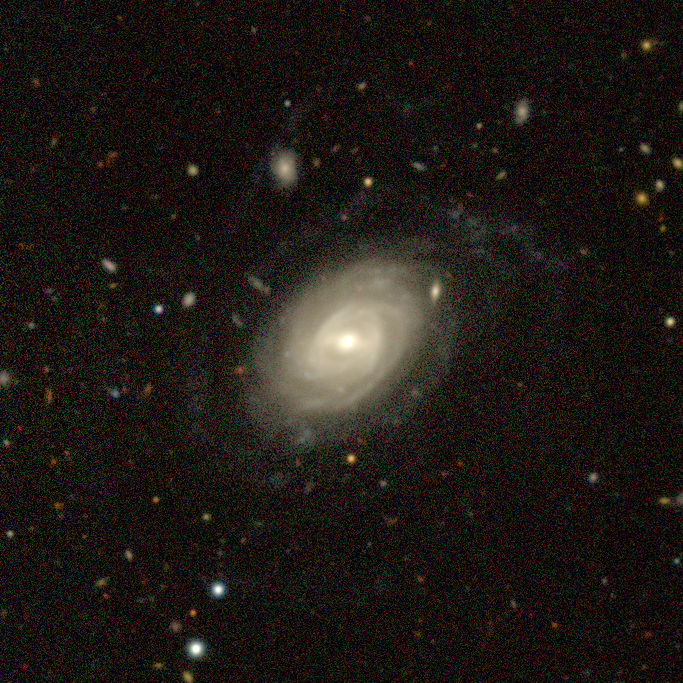
PGC 2759 with DECam

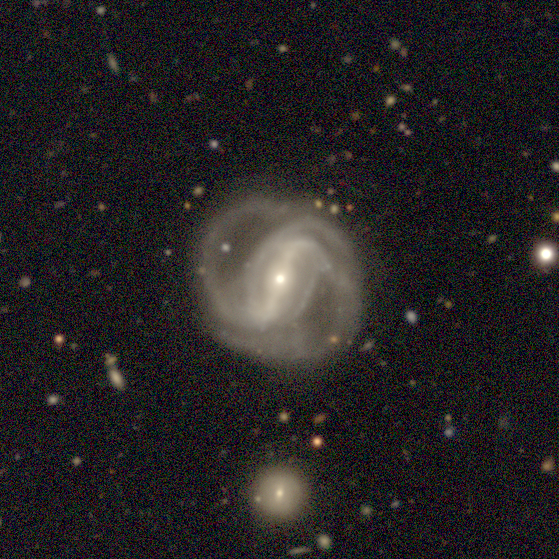
PGC 3406 with DECam
