= NGC 409 =

Elliptical galaxy in the constellation of Sculptor

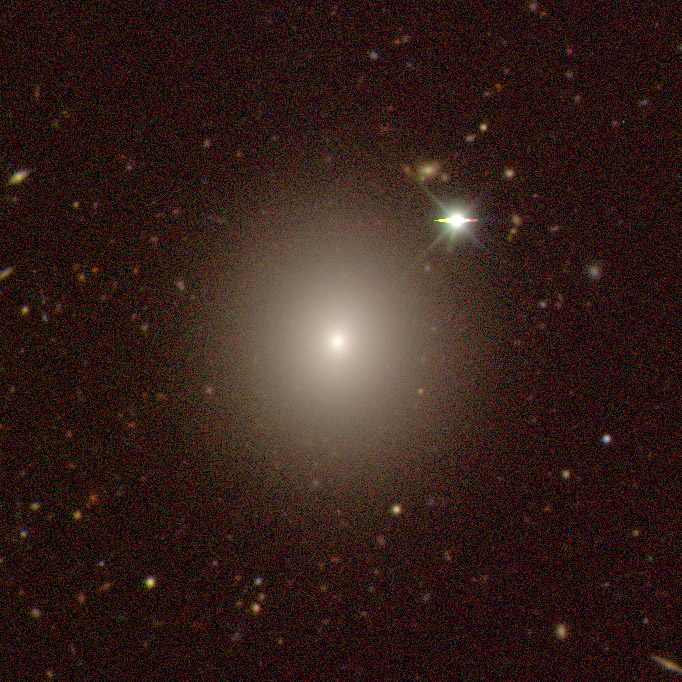
- NGC 409 as seen by DECam

Observation data (J2000 epoch)
- Constellation: Sculptor
- Right ascension: 01^{h} 09^{m} 33.2^{s}
- Declination: −35° 48′ 20″
- Redshift: 0.022075
- Heliocentric radial velocity: 6,618 km/s
- Apparent magnitude (V): 14.26

Characteristics
- Type: E:
- Apparent size (V): 1.3' × 1.1'

Other designations
- ESO 352- G 012, MCG -06-03-023, 2MASS J01093323-3548203, 2MASXi J0109332-354820, ESO-LV 3520120, 6dF J0109332-354820, PGC 4132.

NGC 409 is an elliptical galaxy located in the constellation Sculptor. It was discovered on November 29, 1837 by John Herschel. It was described by Dreyer as "extremely faint, small, round, very small (faint) star near."

== See also ==
- List of NGC objects (1–1000)
