= NGC 357 =

Galaxy in the constellation Cetus

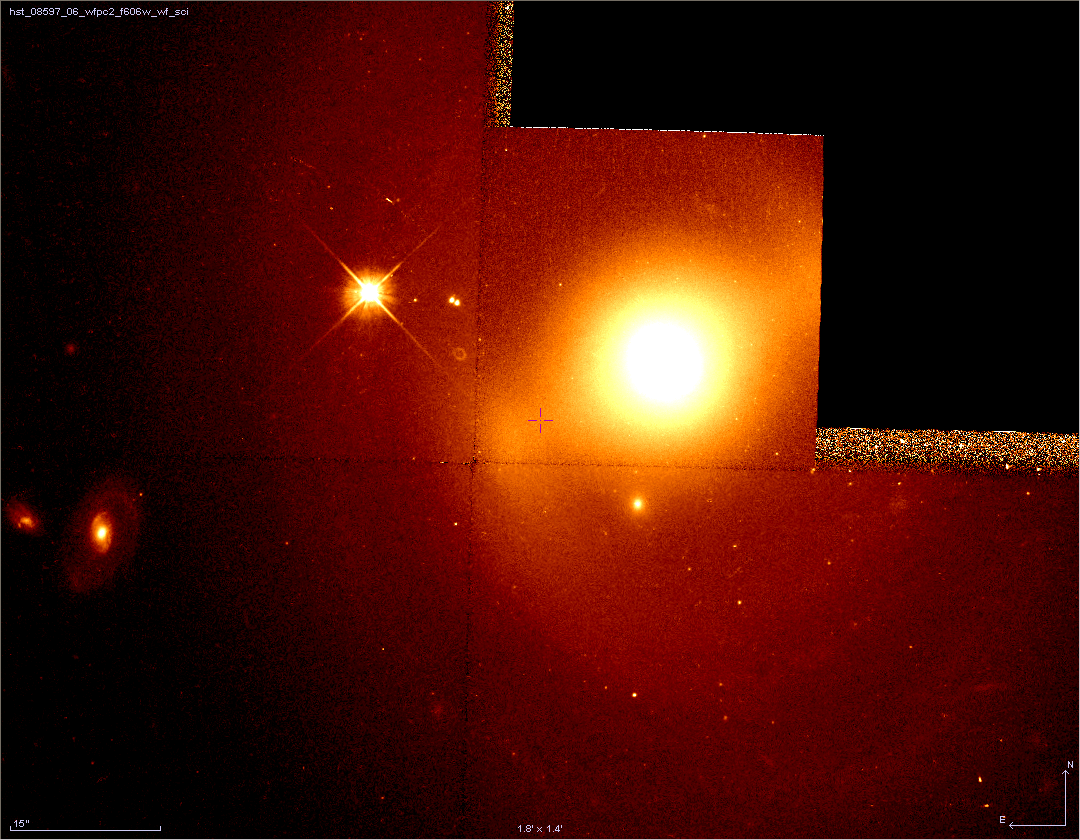
- NGC 357 by Hubble Space Telescope

Observation data (J2000 epoch)
- Constellation: Cetus
- Right ascension: 01^{h} 03^{m} 21.9^{s}
- Declination: −06° 20′ 21″
- Redshift: 0.008026
- Heliocentric radial velocity: 2,406 km/s
- Apparent magnitude (V): 13.14

Characteristics
- Type: SB0/a?(r)
- Apparent size (V): 2.4' × 1.7'

Other designations
- MCG -01-03-081, 2MASX J01032187-0620213, 2MASXi J0103218-062015, 6dF J0103218-062021, PGC 3768.

NGC 357 is a barred lenticular or spiral galaxy in the constellation Cetus. It was discovered on September 10, 1785, by William Herschel. It was described by Dreyer as "faint, small, irregularly round, suddenly brighter middle, 14th magnitude star 20 arcsec to northeast."

== See also ==
- List of NGC objects (1–1000)
