= NGC 430 =

Elliptical galaxy in the constellation Cetus

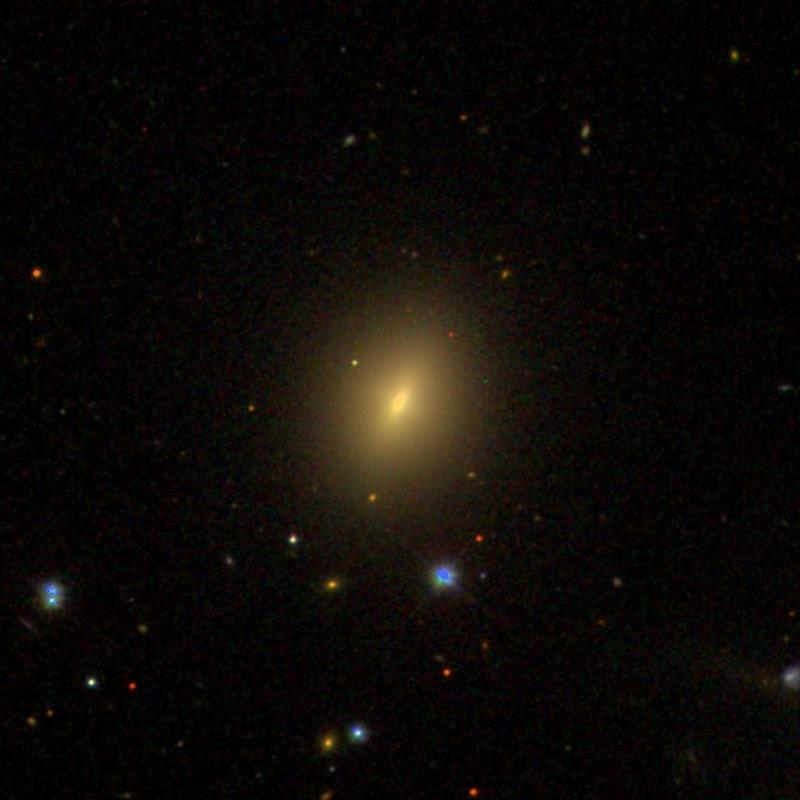
- NGC 430 as seen by SDSS

Observation data (J2000 epoch)
- Constellation: Cetus
- Right ascension: 01^{h} 12^{m} 59.9^{s}
- Declination: −00° 15′ 09″
- Redshift: 0.017676
- Heliocentric radial velocity: 5,299 km/s
- Distance: 355.71 ± 213.16 Mly (109.060 ± 65.354 Mpc)
- Apparent magnitude (V): 13.9b
- Absolute magnitude (V): -23.03

Characteristics
- Type: E:
- Apparent size (V): 1.3' × 1.1'

Other designations
- UGC 00765, CGCG 385-029, MCG +00-04-039, 2MASX J01125992-0015087, 2MASXi J0112599-001509, 6dF J0112599-001509, 6dFGSv 00674, PGC 4376.

NGC 430 is an elliptical galaxy of type E: located in the constellation Cetus. It was discovered on October 1, 1785 by William Herschel. It was described by Dreyer as "faint, very small, round, very suddenly brighter middle similar to star."
