= NGC 442 =

Spiral galaxy in the constellation Cetus

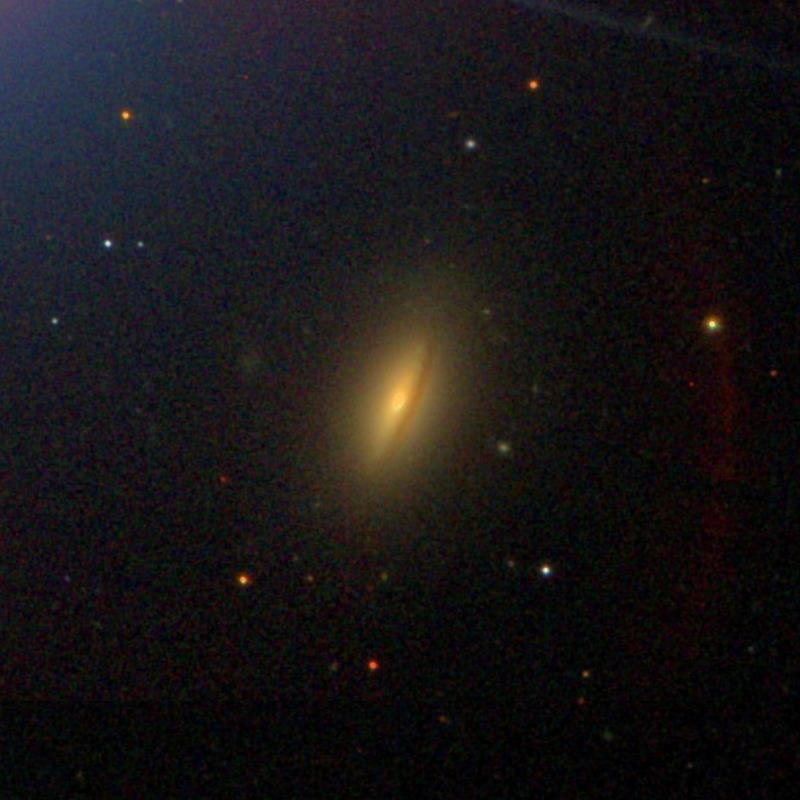
- SDSS view of NGC 442

Observation data (J2000 epoch)
- Constellation: Cetus
- Right ascension: 01^{h} 14^{m} 38.6^{s}
- Declination: −01° 01′ 14″
- Redshift: 0.018640
- Heliocentric radial velocity: 5,588 km/s
- Distance: 261.58 Mly (80.200 Mpc)
- Apparent magnitude (V): 14.45
- Absolute magnitude (V): -22.42

Characteristics
- Type: S0/a? (edge on)
- Apparent size (V): 1.0' × 0.5'

Other designations
- UGC 00789, CGCG 385–041, MCG +00-04-054, 2MASX J01143863-0101139, 2MASXi J0114385-010113, 6dF J0114385-010114, 6dFGSv 00692, PGC 4484.

NGC 442 is a spiral galaxy of type S0/a? (edge on) located in the constellation Cetus. Lewis Swift discovered it on October 21, 1886. Dreyer first described it as "very faint, small, round, bright star to southeast." The star is actually located northeast of NGC 442, but, due to the way optical telescopes worked, it was not unusual for some confusion of directions to occur.
