= NGC 342 =

Lenticular galaxy in the constellation Cetus

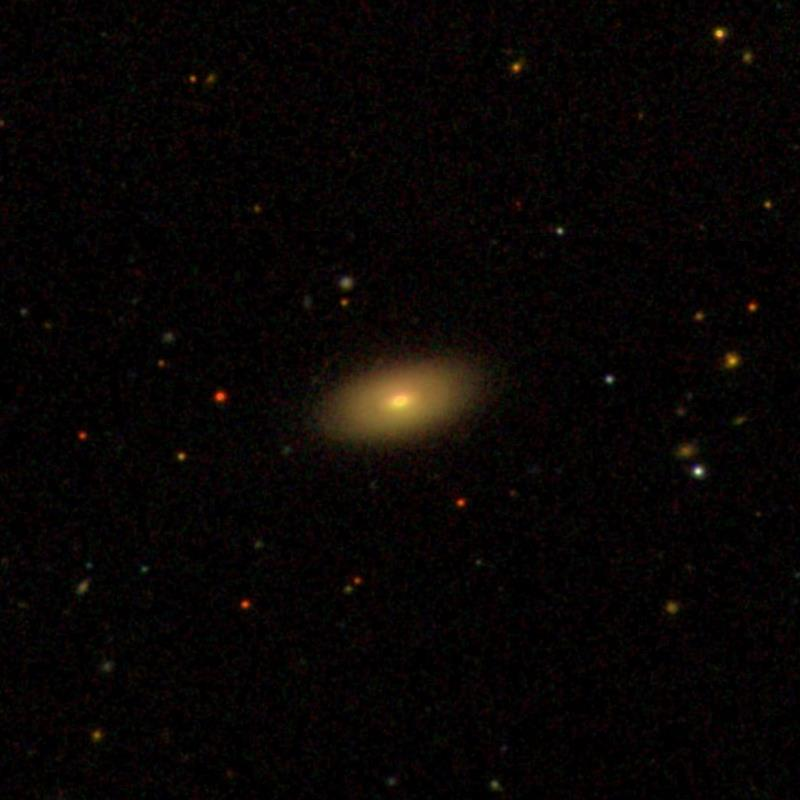
- SDSS image of NGC 342

Observation data (J2000 epoch)
- Constellation: Cetus
- Right ascension: 01^{h} 00^{m} 49.8^{s}
- Declination: −06° 46′ 21″
- Redshift: 0.019403
- Heliocentric radial velocity: 5,817 km/s
- Apparent magnitude (V): 15.41

Characteristics
- Type: S0
- Apparent size (V): 0.6' × 0.3'

Other designations
- MCG -01-03-058, 2MASX J01004985-0646207, 2MASXi J0100498-064620, 6dF J0100499-064621, PGC 3631.

NGC 342 is a lenticular galaxy in the constellation Cetus. It was discovered on September 27, 1864 by Albert Marth. It was described by Dreyer as "very faint, very small."
