= NGC 417 =

Lenticular galaxy in the constellation Cetus

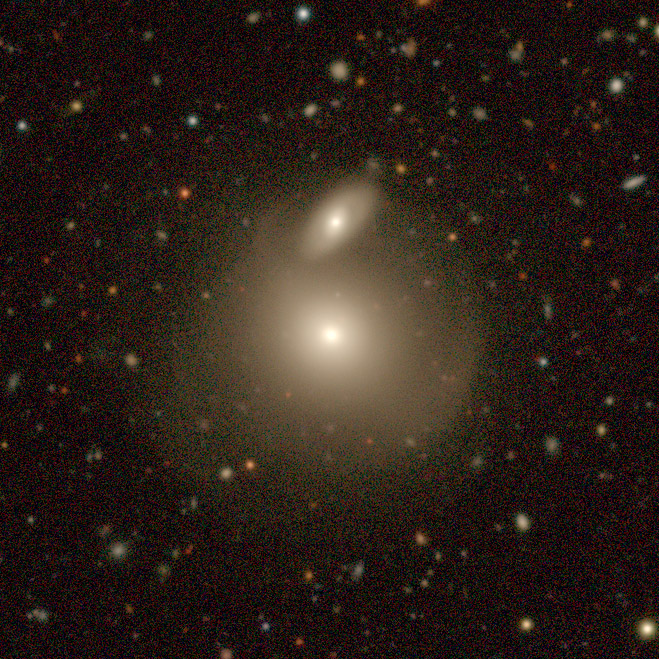
- legacy surveys image of NGC 417

Observation data (J2000 epoch)
- Constellation: Cetus
- Right ascension: 01^{h} 11^{m} 05.5^{s}
- Declination: −18° 08′ 54″
- Redshift: 0.042223
- Heliocentric radial velocity: 12,658 km/s
- Distance: 534.90 Mly (164.000 Mpc)
- Apparent magnitude (V): 15.13
- Absolute magnitude (V): -22.46

Characteristics
- Type: SAB0^{−}
- Apparent size (V): 0.6' × 0.5'

Other designations
- ESO 541- G 024, MCG -03-04-019, 2MASX J01110557-1808534, 2MASXi J0111055-180854, ESO-LV 5410240, 6dF J0111055-180854, PGC 4237.

NGC 417 is a lenticular galaxy of type SAB0^{−} located in the constellation Cetus. It was discovered in 1886 by Francis Leavenworth. It was described by Dreyer as "extremely faint, extremely small, round."
