= NGC 347 =

Spiral galaxy in the constellation Cetus

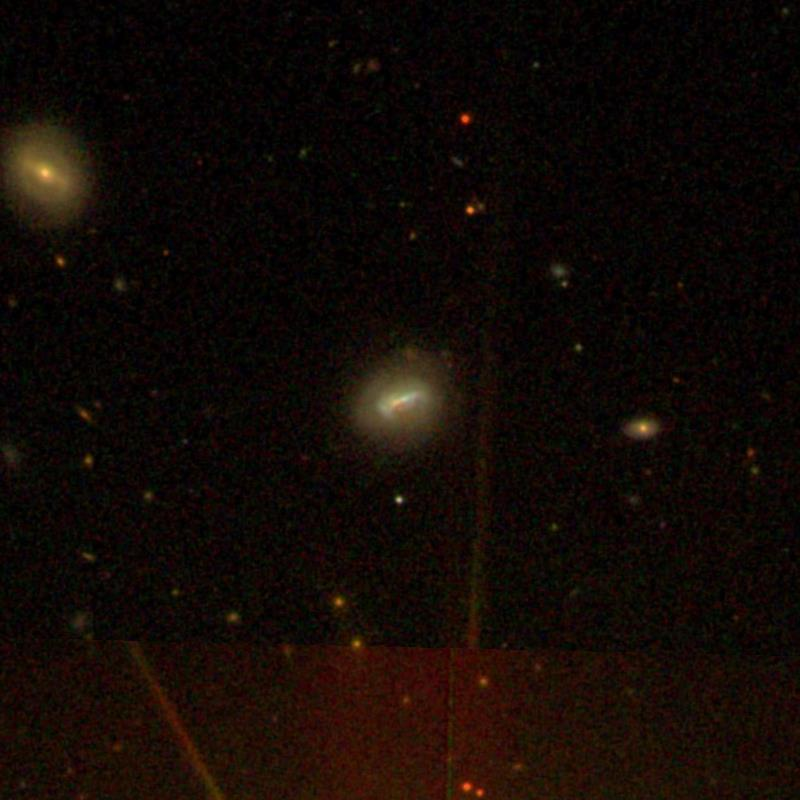
- SDSS image of NGC 347

Observation data (J2000 epoch)
- Constellation: Cetus
- Right ascension: 01^{h} 01^{m} 35.1^{s}
- Declination: −06° 44′ 01″
- Redshift: 0.018630
- Heliocentric radial velocity: 5,585 km/s
- Apparent magnitude (V): 15.54

Characteristics
- Type: S
- Apparent size (V): 0.6' × 0.6'

Other designations
- MCG -01-03-063, 2MASX J01013515-0644012, 2MASXi J0101352-064401, 6dF J0101352-064401, PGC 3673.

NGC 347 is a spiral galaxy in the constellation Cetus. It was discovered on September 27, 1864, by Albert Marth. It was described by Dreyer as "very faint, very small."
