= NGC 345 =

Spiral galaxy in the constellation Cetus

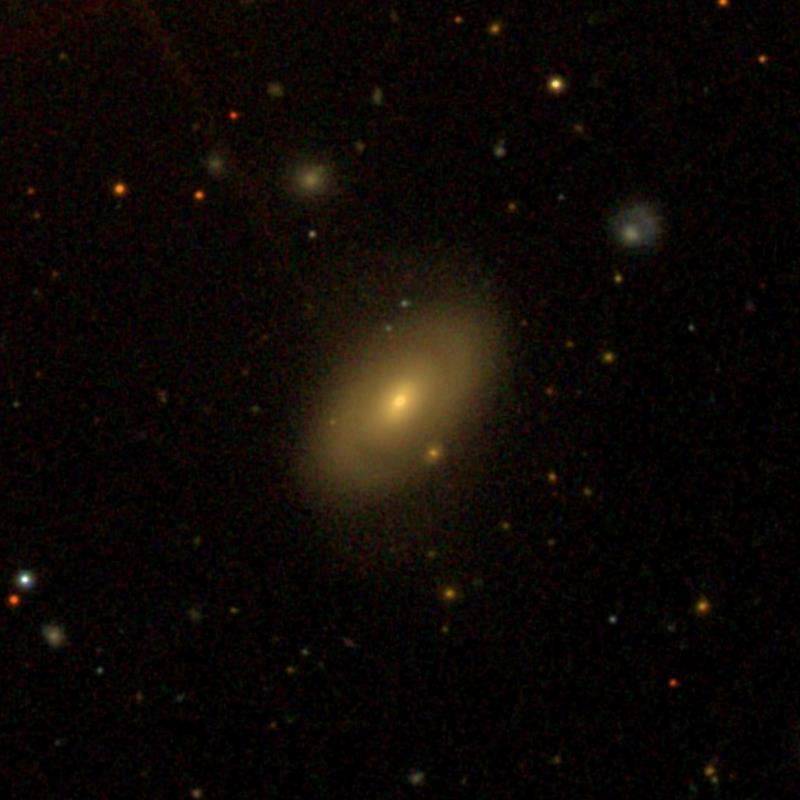
- SDSS image of NGC 345

Observation data (J2000 epoch)
- Constellation: Cetus
- Right ascension: 01^{h} 01^{m} 22.1^{s}
- Declination: −06° 53′ 03″
- Redshift: 0.017592
- Heliocentric radial velocity: 5,274 km/s
- Apparent magnitude (V): 14.86

Characteristics
- Type: SA(s)a
- Apparent size (V): 1.2' × 0.8'

Other designations
- MCG -01-03-064, 2MASX J01012211-0653034, 2MASXi J0101221-065303, 6dF J0101221-065303, PGC 3665.

NGC 345 is a spiral galaxy located in the constellation Cetus. It was discovered on September 27, 1864 by Albert Marth. It was described by Dreyer as "very faint, very small, gradually brighter middle."
