= NGC 336 =

Spiral galaxy in the constellation Cetus

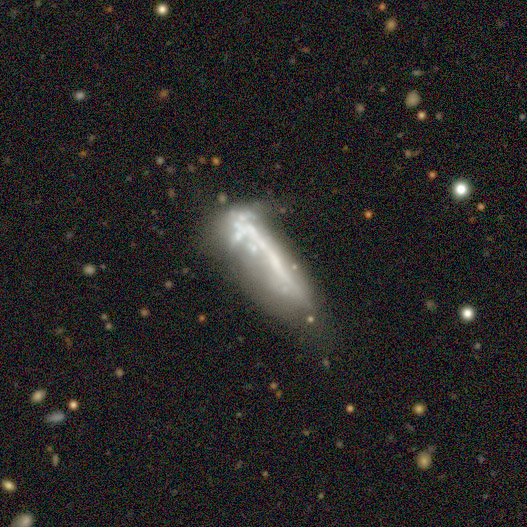
- DECam image of PGC 3470 (NGC 336)

Observation data (J2000 epoch)
- Constellation: Cetus
- Right ascension: 00^{h} 58^{m} 02.8^{s}
- Declination: −18° 23′ 04″
- Redshift: 0.018349
- Heliocentric radial velocity: 5,501 km/s
- Apparent magnitude (V): 15.44

Characteristics
- Type: Sc
- Apparent size (V): 0.73' × 0.29'

Other designations
- ESO 541-IG 002, 2MASX J00580282-1823032, 2MASXi J0058025-182306, IRAS 00555-1839, F00555-1839, ESO-LV 5410020, 6dF J0058027-182304, PGC 3470.

NGC 336 is a spiral galaxy in the constellation Cetus. It was discovered on October 31, 1885 by Francis Leavenworth. It was described by Dreyer as "very faint, small, round, suddenly brighter middle." It is also known as PGC 3470. Despite this, sometimes it is mistakenly identified as PGC 3526.
