= NGC 351 =

Spiral galaxy in the constellation Cetus

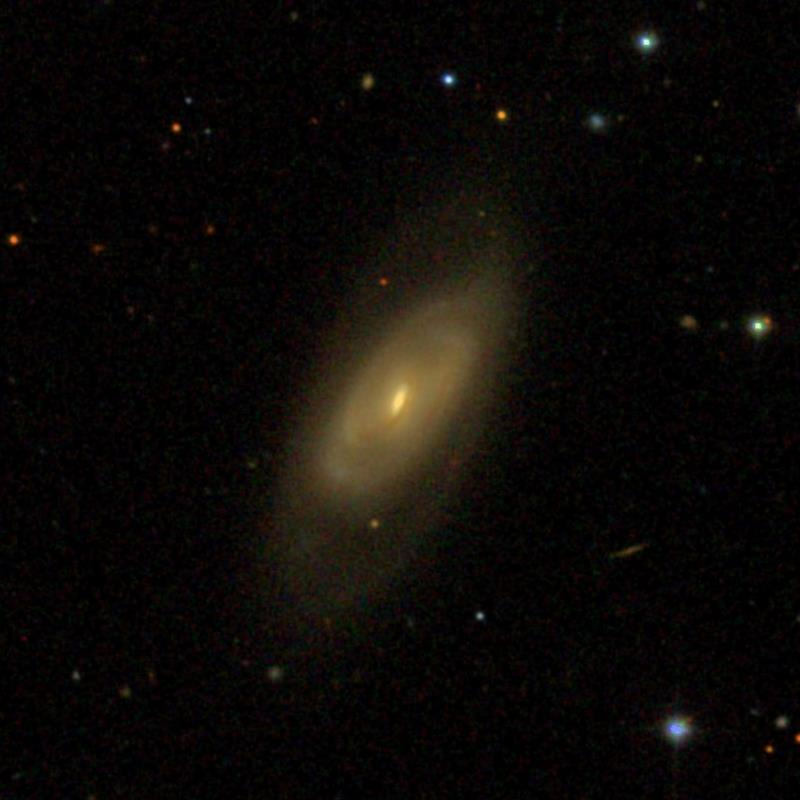
- SDSS image of NGC 351

Observation data (J2000 epoch)
- Constellation: Cetus
- Right ascension: 01^{h} 01^{m} 57.8^{s}
- Declination: −01° 56′ 12″
- Redshift: 0.014093
- Heliocentric radial velocity: 4,225 km/s
- Apparent magnitude (V): 14.06

Characteristics
- Type: SB0/a
- Apparent size (V): 1.4' × 0.8'

Other designations
- UGC 00639, CGCG 384-057, MCG +00-03-057, 2MASX J01015784-0156124, 2MASXi J0101578-015611, IRAS F00593-0212, 6dF J0101577-015612, PGC 3693.

NGC 351 is a spiral galaxy in the constellation Cetus. It was discovered on November 10, 1885 by Lewis Swift. It was described by Dreyer as "extremely faint, pretty small, northwestern of 2.", the other being NGC 353.

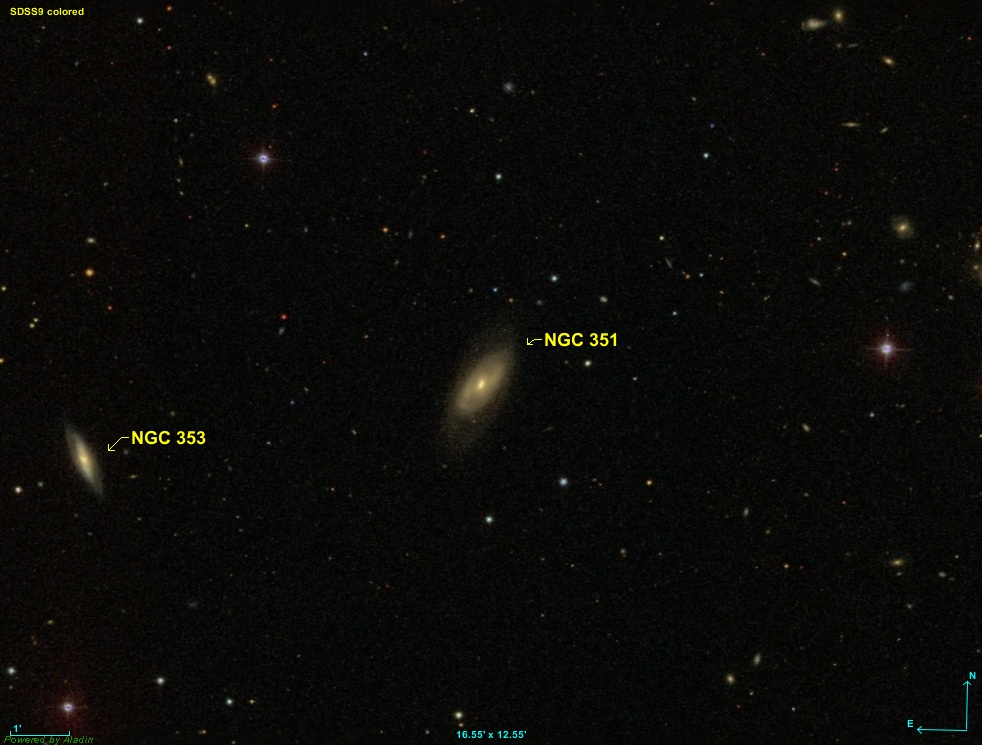
NGC 351 and NGC 353 (SDSS)
