= NGC 244 =

Galaxy in the Cetus constellation

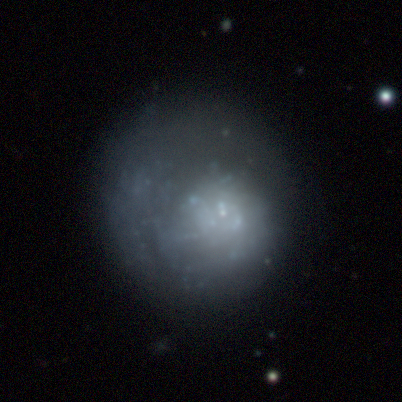
- DECam image of NGC 244

Observation data (J2000 epoch)
- Constellation: Cetus
- Right ascension: 00^{h} 45^{m} 46.4424^{s}
- Declination: −15° 35′ 48.703″
- Redshift: 0.003140
- Apparent magnitude (V): 13.83

Characteristics
- Type: S0
- Apparent size (V): 1.2' × 1.0'

Other designations
- 2MASXi J0045464-153548, 6dF J0045464-153549, IRAS F00432-1552, 2MASX J00454643-1535487, UGCA 10, MCG -03-03-003, PGC 2675.

NGC 244 is a lenticular galaxy located in the constellation Cetus. It was discovered on December 30, 1785, by William Herschel.

== See also ==
- List of NGC objects (1–1000)
