= NGC 433 =

Open cluster in the constellation Cassiopeia

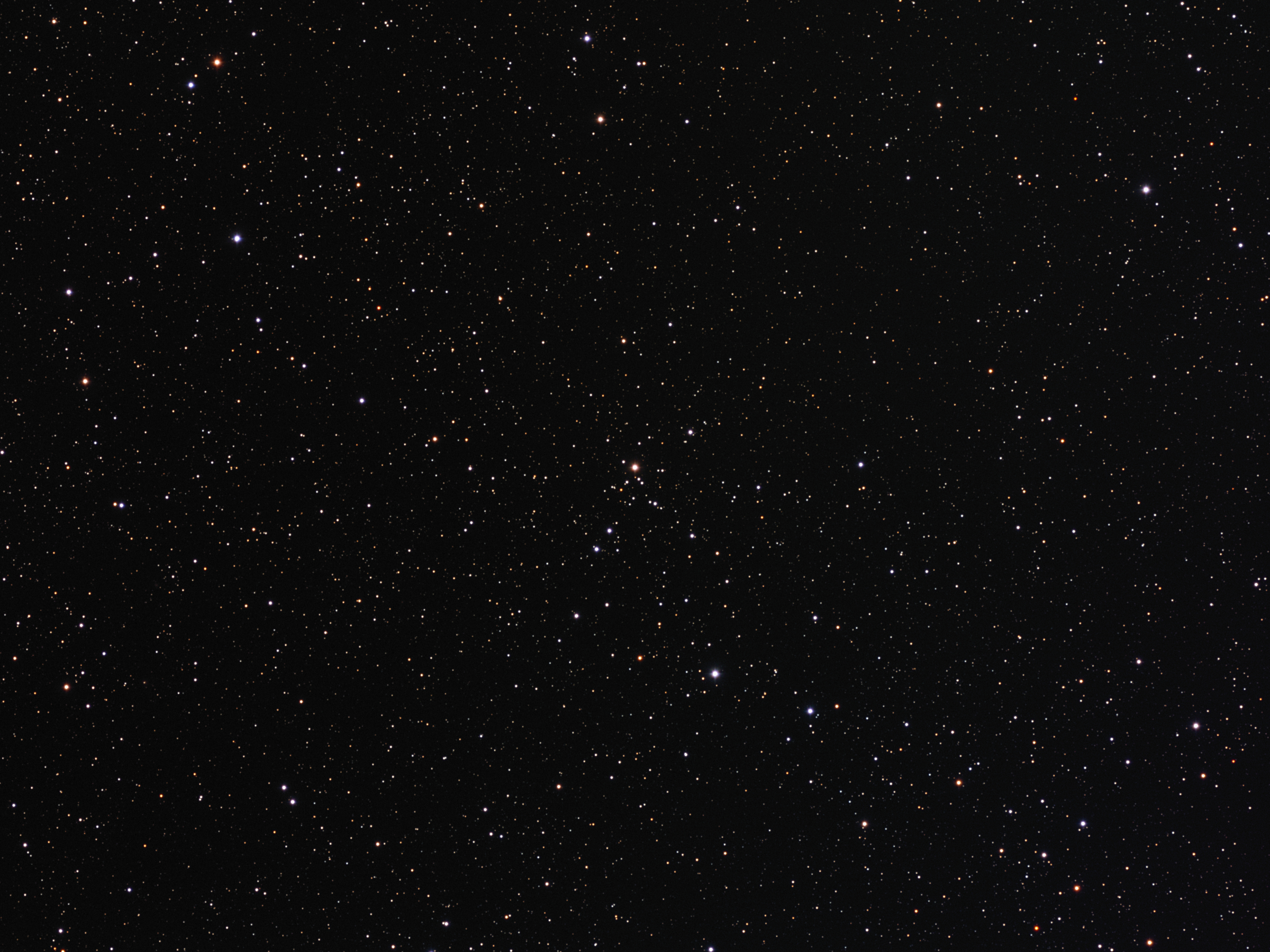

Observation data (J2000 epoch)
- Right ascension: 01^{h} 15^{m} 12.0^{s}
- Declination: +60° 08′ 00″
- Distance: 6.5 kly (2.0 kpc)

Physical characteristics
- Mass: 479+810 −301 M_{☉}
- Estimated age: 65 Myr
- Other designations: C 0112+598, OCISM 71, OCl 319, [KPR2004b] 16, [KPS2012] MWSC 0110.

Associations
- Constellation: Cassiopeia

NGC 433 is an open cluster in the northern constellation of Cassiopeia, located at a distance of 6,500 light years from the Sun. It was discovered on September 29, 1829, by John Herschel, and was described by John Dreyer as "cluster, small, a little compressed." The cluster is considered on the poor side, with only 12 stars above magnitude 16. It has a linear diameter of 26.3 ly, with around 479 times the mass of the Sun and an age of 65 million years.
