= NGC 171 =

Barred spiral galaxy in the constellation Cetus

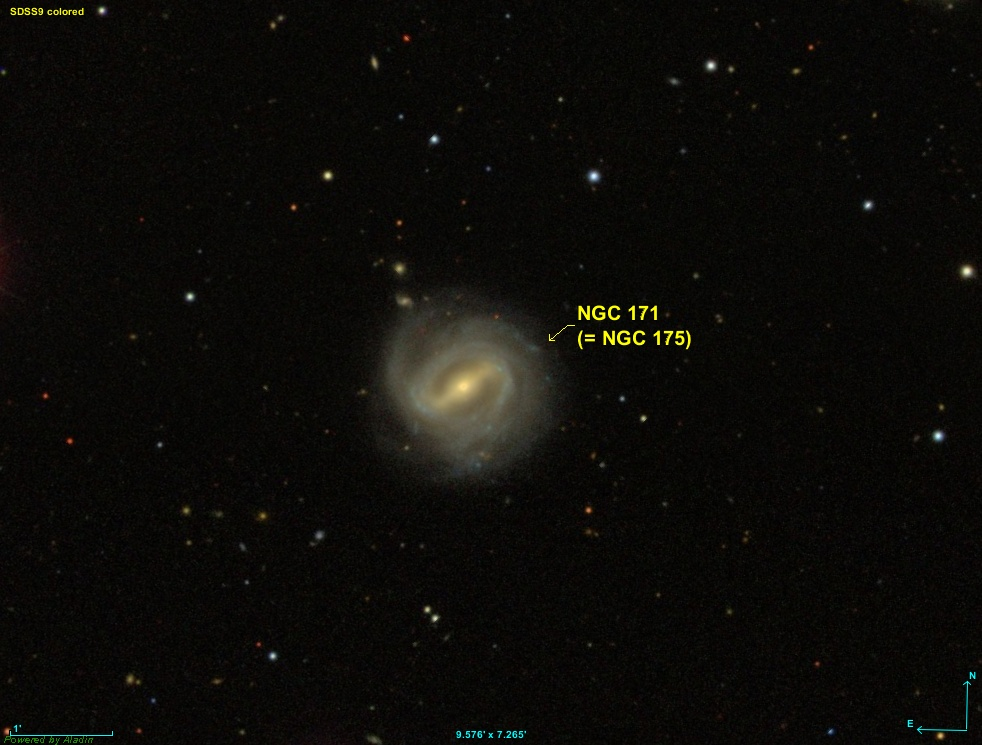
- NGC 171 as seen on SDSS

Observation data (J2000 epoch)
- Constellation: Cetus
- Right ascension: 00^{h} 37^{m} 21.5^{s}
- Declination: −19° 56′ 03″
- Redshift: 0.013043
- Apparent magnitude (V): 12.90

Characteristics
- Type: SBb
- Apparent size (V): 2.1' × 1.9'

Other designations
- ESO 540- G 006, MCG -03-02-024, 2MASX J00372152-1956032, 2MASXi J0037129-195609, IRAS 00348-2012, IRAS F00348-2012, ESO-LV 5400060, 6dF J0037125-195603, PGC 2232.

NGC 171 is a barred spiral galaxy with an apparent magnitude of 12, located around 200 million light-years away in the constellation Cetus. The galaxy has two main medium-wound arms, with a few minor arms, and a fairly bright nucleus and bulge. It was discovered on 20 October 1784 by William Herschel. It is also known as NGC 175.

== Supernova ==
One supernova has been observed in NGC 171: SN 2009hf (Type II-P, mag. 17.2) was discovered by Berto Monard on 9 July 2009.

== See also ==
- List of NGC objects (1–1000)
