= NGC 270 =

Galaxy located in the constellation Cetus

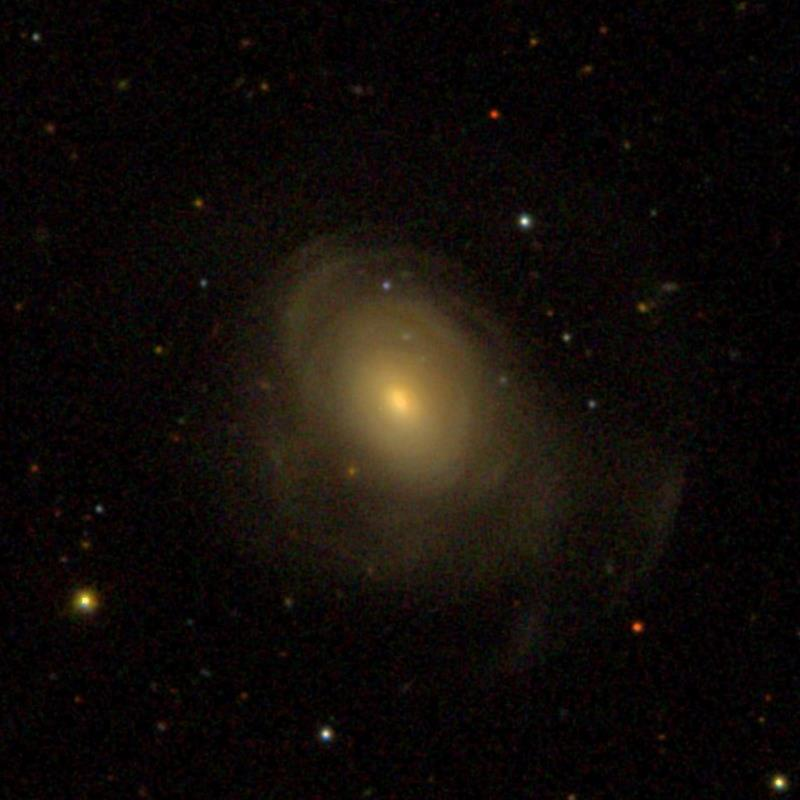
- SDSS image of NGC 270

Observation data (J2000 epoch)
- Constellation: Cetus
- Right ascension: 00^{h} 50^{m} 32.5^{s}
- Declination: −08° 39′ 06″
- Redshift: 0.012585
- Apparent magnitude (V): 13.97

Characteristics
- Type: S0
- Apparent size (V): 1.7' × 1.5'

Other designations
- MCG -02-03-027, 2MASX J00503252-0839057, IRAS F00480-0855, 6dF J0050325-083906, PGC 2938.

NGC 270 is a lenticular galaxy in the constellation Cetus. It was discovered on December 10, 1798 by William Herschel.
