= NGC 459 =

Spiral galaxy in the constellation Pisces

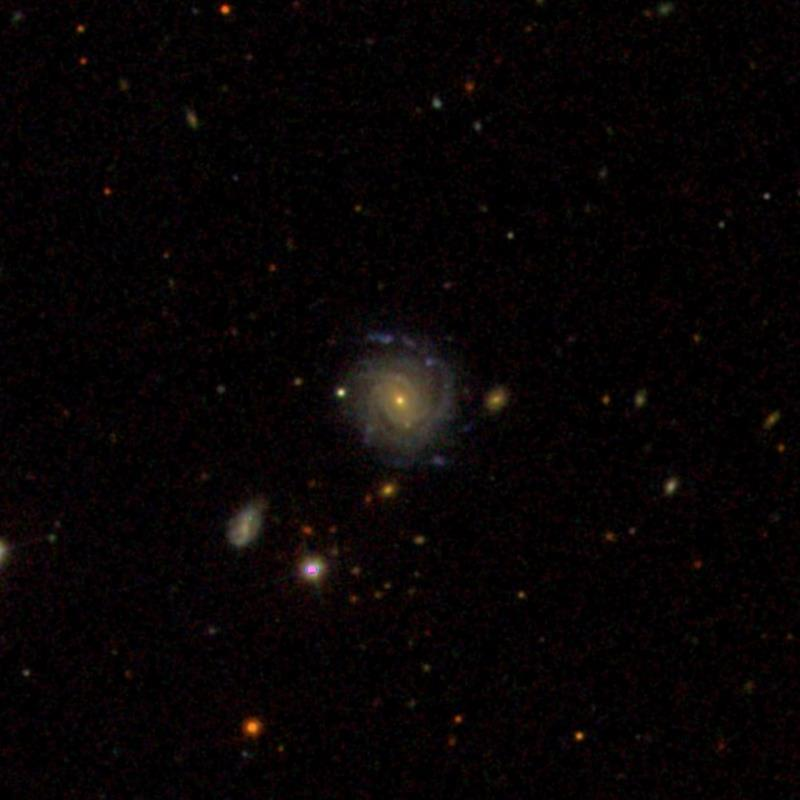
- NGC 459 imaged by SDSS

Observation data (J2000 epoch)
- Constellation: Pisces
- Right ascension: 01^{h} 18^{m} 08.1837^{s}
- Declination: +17° 33′ 44.400″
- Redshift: 0.0424
- Heliocentric radial velocity: 12705 +/- 5 km/s
- Galactocentric velocity: 12818 +/- 7 km/s
- Distance: 596.2 ± 41.7 Mly (182.80 ± 12.80 Mpc)
- Apparent magnitude (V): 14.7
- Apparent magnitude (B): 15.5
- Absolute magnitude (V): -21.28

Characteristics
- Type: SBc
- Apparent size (V): 1.0′ × 0.9′

Other designations
- 2MASX J01180818+1733448, UGC 832, MCG +03-04-017, PGC 4665, CGCG 459-024

NGC 459 is a spiral galaxy in the constellation Pisces. Its velocity with respect to the cosmic microwave background is 12,394±22 km/s, which corresponds to a Hubble distance of 596.2 ± 41.7 Mly (182.80 ± 12.80 Mpc). It was discovered by German-British astronomer William Herschel on 15 October 1784. It was described as being extremely faint by John Dreyer in the New General Catalogue.

== Supernova ==
One supernova has been observed in NGC 459: SN 2011fv (Type II, mag. 18.2) was discovered by F. Ciabattari and E. Mazzoni, as part of the Italian Supernovae Search Project (ISSP), on 26 August 2011.
