= NGC 291 =

Barred spiral galaxy located in the constellation Cetus

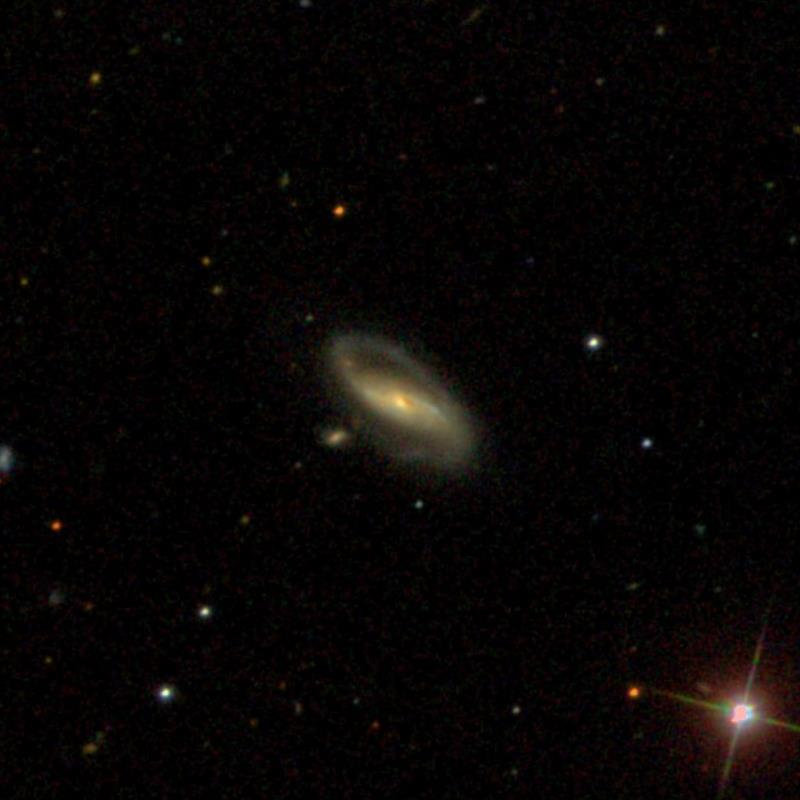
- SDSS image of NGC 291

Observation data (J2000 epoch)
- Constellation: Cetus
- Right ascension: 00^{h} 53^{m} 29.9^{s}
- Declination: −08° 46′ 04″
- Redshift: 0.019029
- Heliocentric radial velocity: 5,705 km/s
- Apparent magnitude (V): 14.5g

Characteristics
- Type: SBa
- Apparent size (V): 1.22' × 0.49'

Other designations
- MCG -02-03-035, 2MASX J00532993-0846034, IRAS 00510-0901, F00509-0902, 6dF J0053298-084604, PGC 3140.

NGC 291 is a barred spiral galaxy in the constellation Cetus. It was discovered on September 27, 1864, by Albert Marth.
