= NGC 215 =

Galaxy in the constellation Phoenix

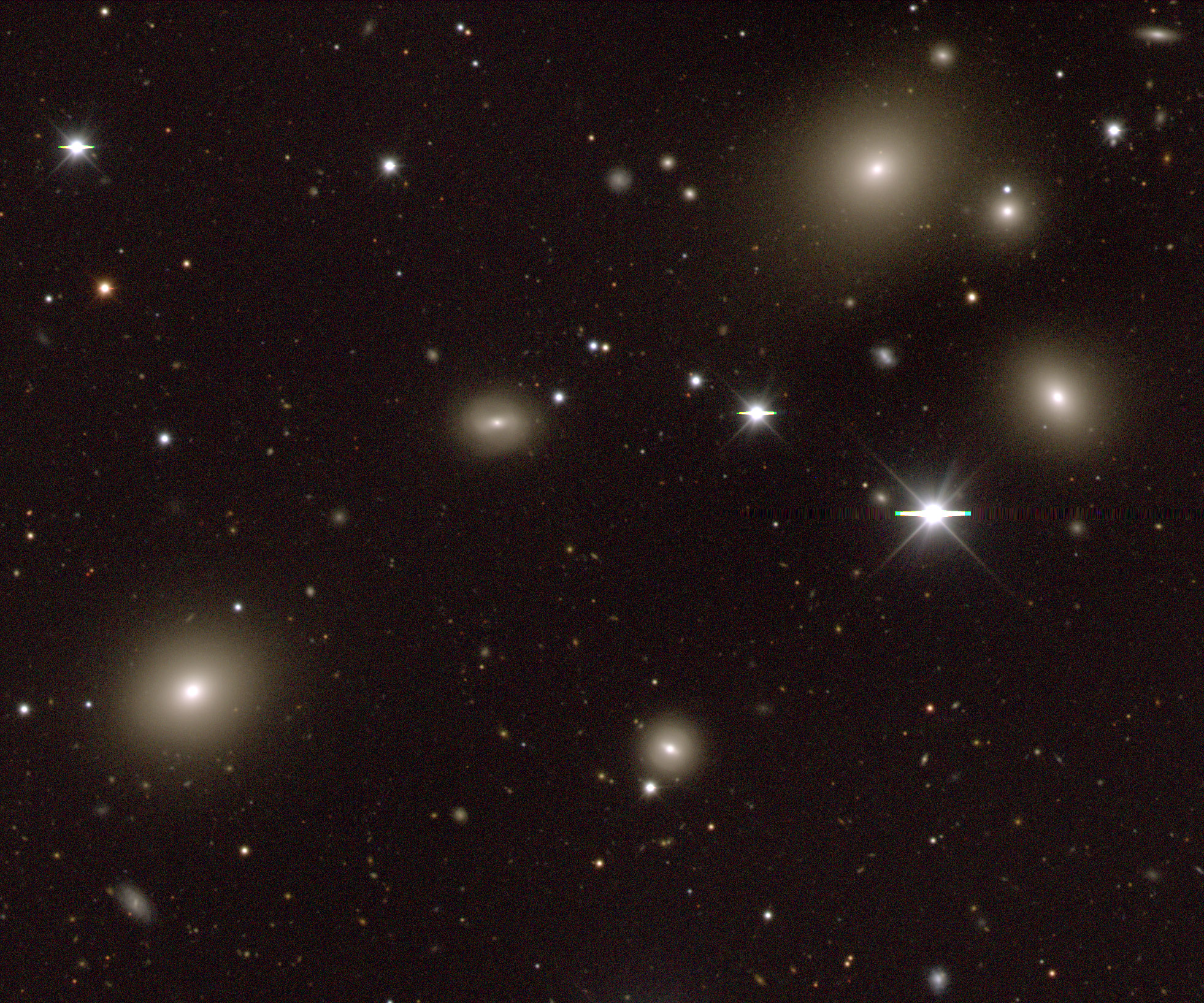
- NGC 215 with DECam (galaxy at the lower left). NGC 212 is the bright galaxy at the upper right.

Observation data (J2000 epoch)
- Constellation: Phoenix
- Right ascension: 00^{h} 40^{m} 48.9^{s}
- Declination: −56° 12′ 51″
- Redshift: 0.027502
- Apparent magnitude (V): 14.05

Characteristics
- Type: S0
- Apparent size (V): 1.1' × 0.9'

Other designations
- ESO 150- G 019, 2MASX J00404885-5612504, ESO-LV 1500190, 6dF J0040489-561251, PGC 2451, PKS B0038-564, PMN J0040-5612, ATPMN J004048.8-561250.

NGC 215 is a lenticular galaxy located in the constellation Phoenix. It was discovered on October 28, 1834, by John Herschel.
