= NGC 216 =

Lenticular galaxy in the constellation Cetus

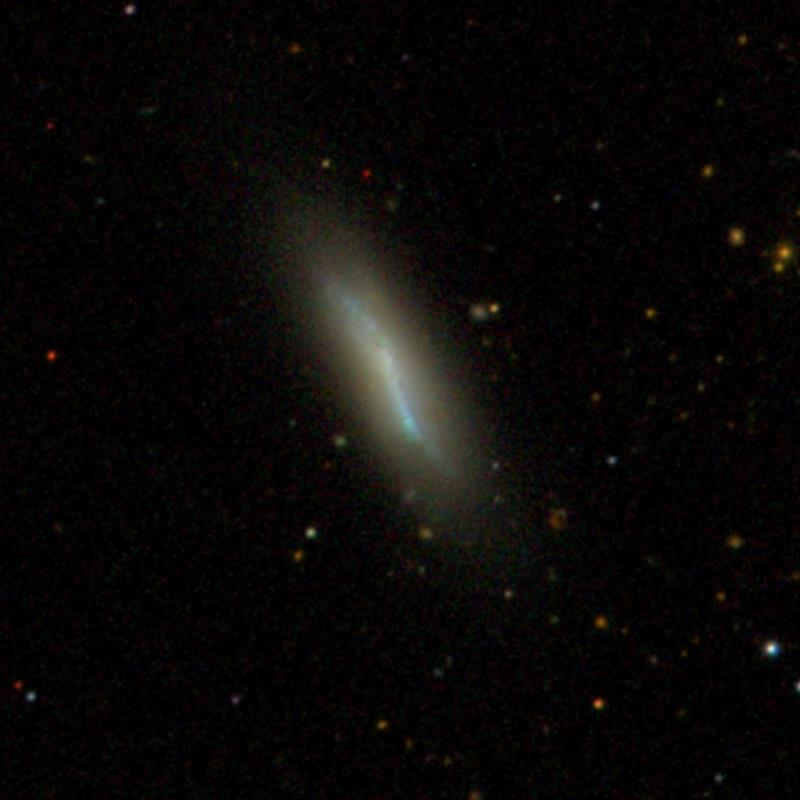
- SDSS image of NGC 216

Observation data (J2000 epoch)
- Constellation: Cetus
- Right ascension: 00^{h} 41^{m} 27.1^{s}
- Declination: −21° 02′ 44″
- Redshift: 0.005150
- Distance: 68.8 Mly
- Apparent magnitude (V): 12.9r

Characteristics
- Type: S0
- Apparent size (V): 2.0' × 0.7'

Other designations
- ESO 540- G 015, MCG -04-02-035, 2MASX J00412688-2102529, IRAS F00389-2119, ESO-LV 5400150, 6dF J0041268-210253, PGC 2478.

NGC 216 is a lenticular galaxy located approximately 68.8 million light-years from the Sun in the constellation Cetus. It was discovered on December 9, 1784, by William Herschel. It has the appearance of a dusty disk galaxy being viewed from edge-on with a peculiar, one-sided bar.

== See also ==
- List of NGC objects (1–1000)
