= NGC 293 =

Barred spiral galaxy located in the constellation Cetus

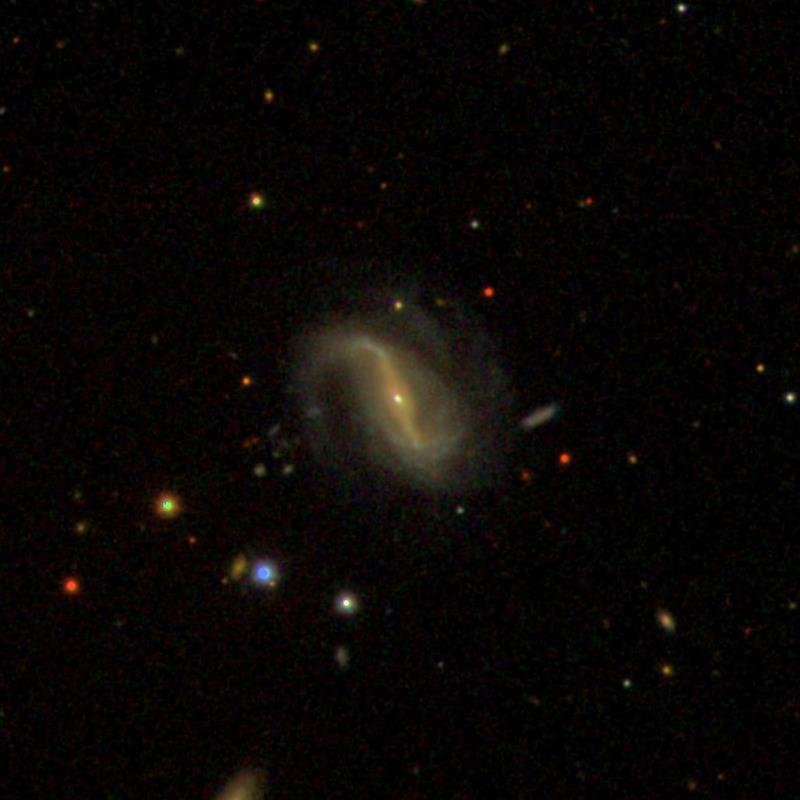

Observation data (J2000 epoch)
- Constellation: Cetus
- Right ascension: 00^{h} 54^{m} 15.9^{s}
- Declination: −07° 14′ 08″
- Redshift: 0.019143
- Heliocentric radial velocity: 5,739 km/s
- Apparent magnitude (V): 15.23

Characteristics
- Type: SBb
- Apparent size (V): 1.1' × 0.9'

Other designations
- MCG -01-03-030, 2MASX J00541594-0714079, 2MASXi J0054159-071406, IRAS 00517-0730, F00517-0730, 6dF J0054160-071408, PGC 3195.

NGC 293 is a barred spiral galaxy in the constellation Cetus. It was discovered on September 27, 1864 by Albert Marth.

== Supernova ==
One supernova has discovered by ZTF

- SN 2026civ (2026.02.04, mag. +18.8)
