= NGC 809 =

Galaxy in the constellation Cetus

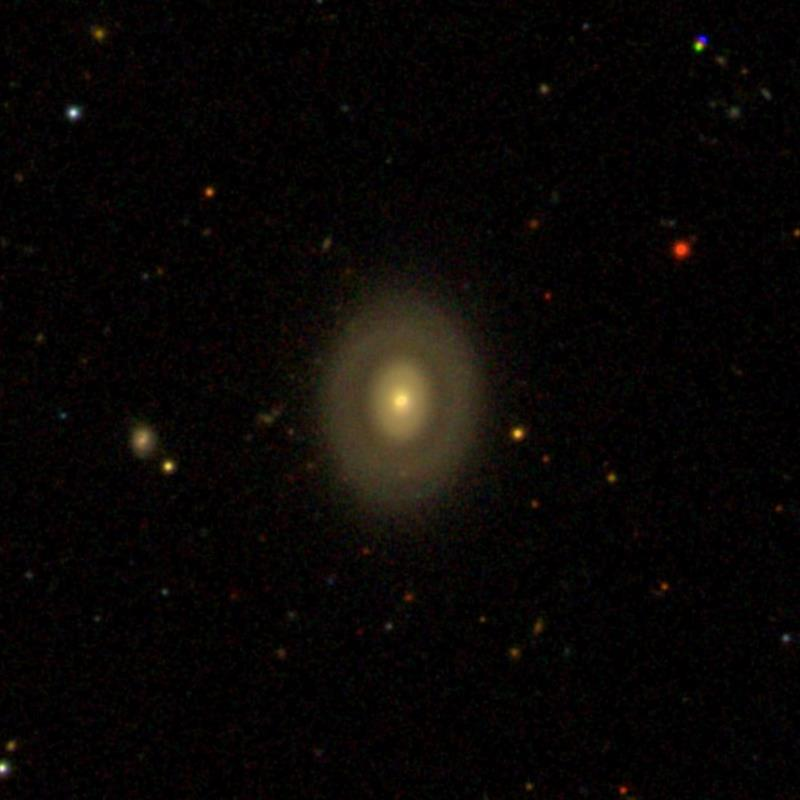

Observation data (J2000 epoch)
- Constellation: Cetus
- Right ascension: 02^{h} 04^{m} 18.97^{s}
- Declination: −08° 44′ 07.06″
- Redshift: 0.01781±0.00001
- Heliocentric radial velocity: 5,292 km/s
- Distance: 245.14 ± 0.29 Mly (75.16 ± 0.09 Mpc)
- Apparent magnitude (B): 14.66

Characteristics
- Type: (R)S0^+?
- Size: ~108,500 ly (33.27 kpc) (estimated)
- Apparent size (V): 1.23′ × 0.92′

Other designations
- 6dF J0204190-084407, NGC 809, MCG -02-06-023, PGC 7889

NGC 809 is a lenticular galaxy located in the constellation Cetus about 245 million light-years (75 Mpc) away from the Milky Way. It was discovered by the American astronomer Lewis Swift in November 1886. The galaxy is receding from the Milky Way with a line of sight velocity component of 5,292 km/s.

The morphological classification of NGC 809 is (R)S0+:, indicating an outer ring structure (R) around a lenticular galaxy (S0). The galaxy has a miniature central bar structure with weakly-developed spiral arms. There is a very red ring structure that is likely dust rich. This symmetrical ring was probably formed by the impact of a satellite on the central part of the galaxy.

== Supernovae ==
Two supernovae have been observed in NGC 809:

- SN 2006ef (Type Ia, mag. 15.6) was discovered by the Lick Observatory Supernova Search (LOSS) on 18 August 2006.
- SN 2025yn (Type II, mag. 18.978) was discovered by ATLAS on 21 January 2025.
