= NGC 800 =

Galaxy in the constellation Cetus

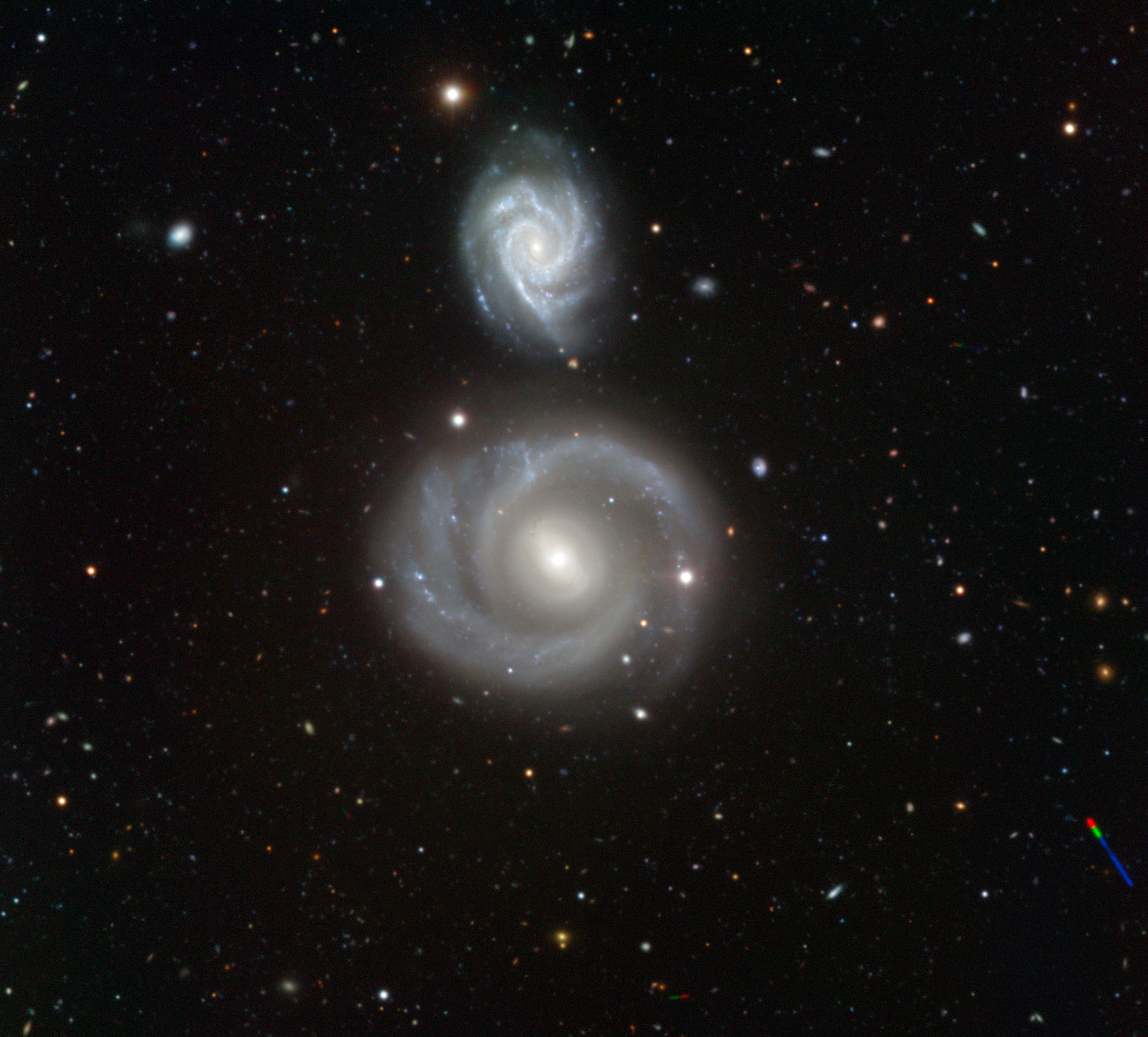
- NGC 800 (top) and NGC 799 (below) image obtained using the FORS1 instrument on the 8.2-meter Very Large Telescope

Observation data (J2000 epoch)
- Constellation: Cetus
- Right ascension: 02^{h} 02^{m} 11.833^{s}
- Declination: −00° 07′ 49.58″
- Redshift: 0.019900
- Heliocentric radial velocity: 5966
- Distance: 300 million ly
- Apparent magnitude (B): 14.7

Characteristics
- Type: SA(rs)c
- Apparent size (V): 1.04′ × 0.68′

Other designations
- KPG 52a, MCG+00-06-024, Z 387-28, 6dFGS gJ020211.8-000750, PGC 7740, UGC 1526

NGC 800, also called UGC 1526 is a spiral galaxy located in the constellation of Cetus. It was first observed by the American astronomer Lewis Swift in 1885.
