= NGC 212 =

Galaxy in the constellation Phoenix

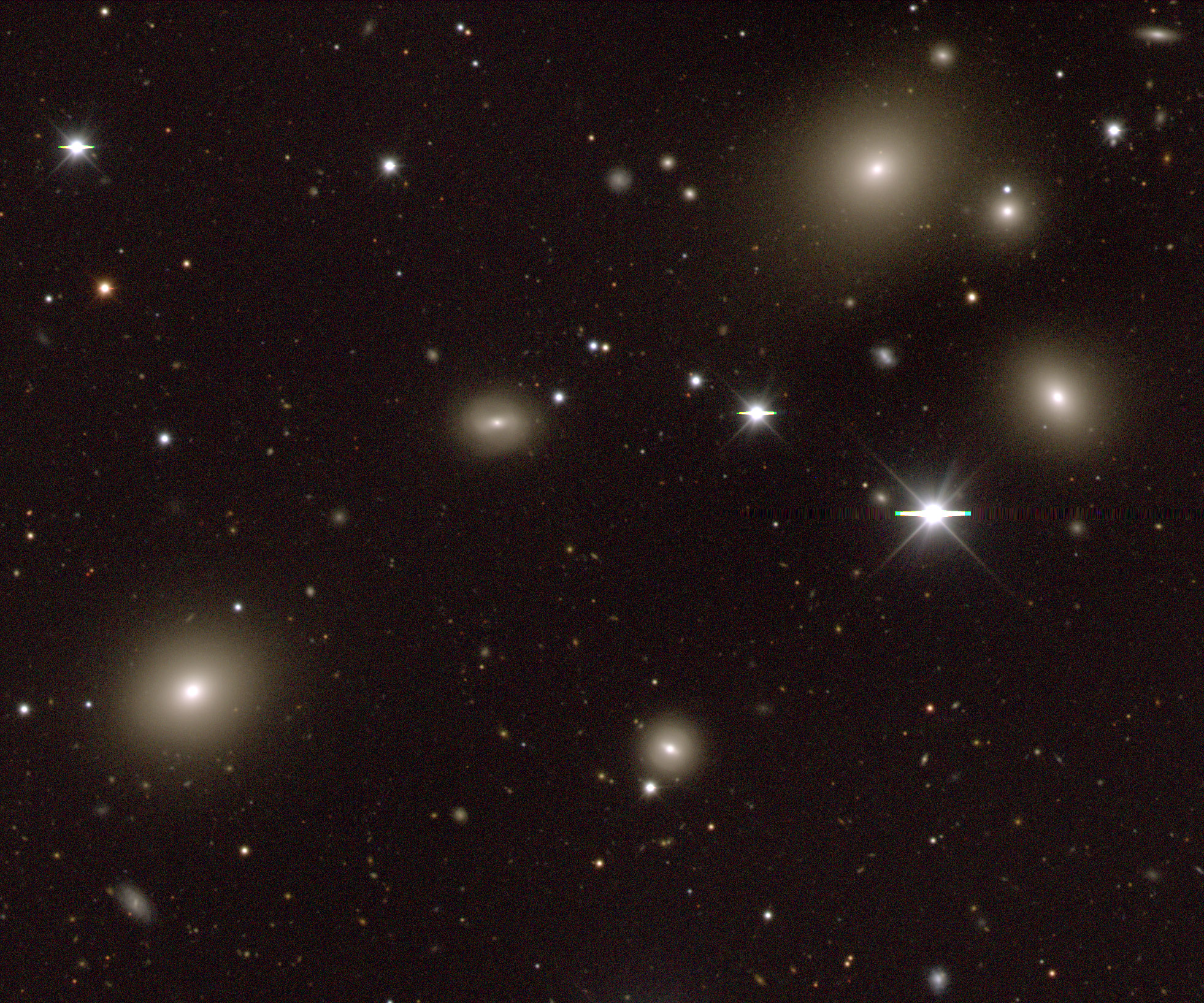
- DECam view of NGC 212 (bright galaxy at the upper right). NGC 215 is located on the lower left.

Observation data (J2000 epoch)
- Constellation: Phoenix
- Right ascension: 00^{h} 40^{m} 13.3^{s}
- Declination: −56° 09′ 11″
- Redshift: 0.027552
- Distance: 369 Mly
- Apparent magnitude (V): 14.39

Characteristics
- Type: S0
- Apparent size (V): 1.3' × 1.0'

Other designations
- ESO 150- G 018, 2MASX J00401332-5609108, ESO-LV 1500180, 6dF J0040133-560911, PGC 2417.

NGC 212 is a lenticular galaxy located approximately 369 million light-years from the Solar System in the constellation Phoenix. It was discovered on October 28, 1834, by John Herschel.

== See also ==
- Lenticular galaxy
- List of NGC objects (1–1000)
- Phoenix (constellation)
