= NGC 373 =

Galaxy in the constellation Pisces

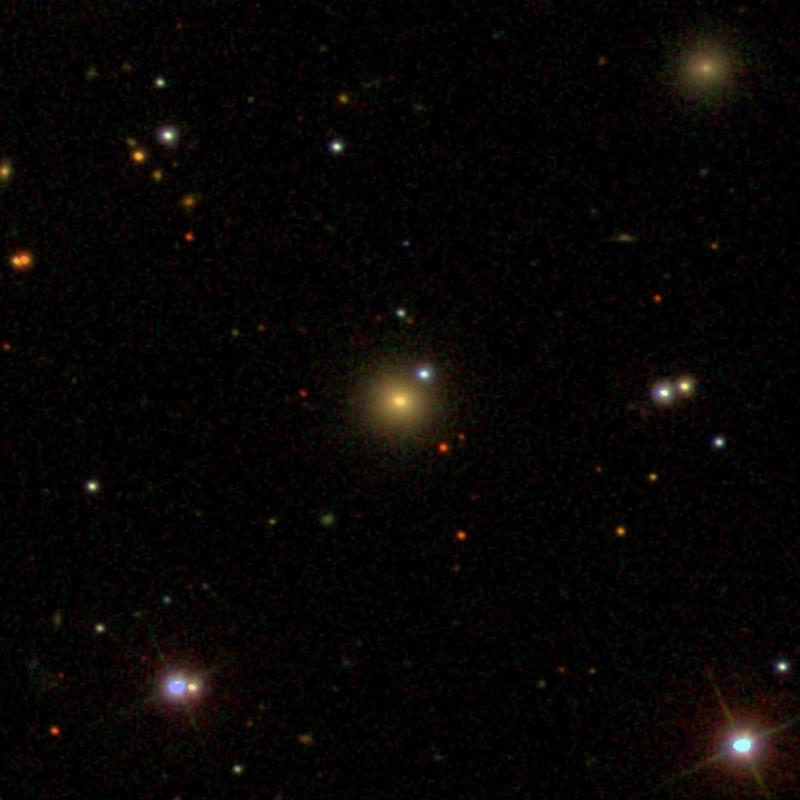
- SDSS image of NGC 373

Observation data (J2000 epoch)
- Constellation: Pisces
- Right ascension: 01^{h} 06^{m} 58.10^{s}
- Declination: +32° 18′ 32.0″
- Redshift: 0.018353
- Distance: 204.86 Mly (62.81 Mpc)
- Apparent magnitude (V): 16.6

Characteristics
- Type: E3
- Size: 37,000 ly
- Apparent size (V): 0.525' x 0.447'
- Notable features: N/A

Other designations
- 2MASX J01065819+3218304, AGC 111066, PGC 3946, LEDA 3946, Gaia DR2 313533956933681792

NGC 373 is an elliptical galaxy located around 204 million light-years away in the constellation Pisces. NGC 373 was discovered on December 12, 1876 by John Louis Emil Dreyer. NGC 373 does not contain an active galactic nucleus, and it does not have much star formation.
