= IC 1657 =

Spiral galaxy

IC 1657 / IC 1663
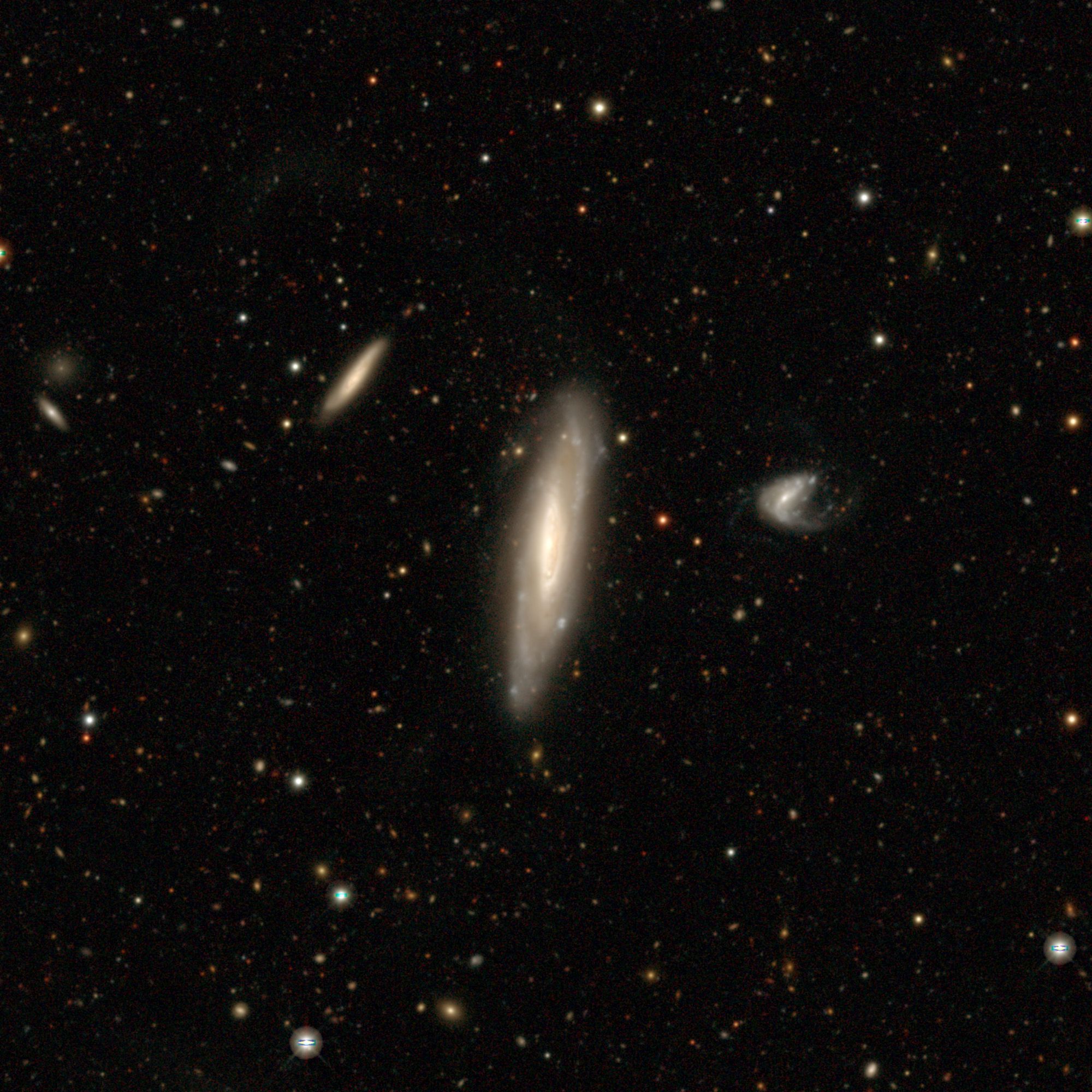
- IC 1657 imaged by DESI Legacy Survey

Observation data
- Constellation: Sculptor
- Right ascension: 01^{h} 14^{m} 07.0^{s}
- Declination: −32° 39′ 03″
- Redshift: 0.011952 ± 0.000013
- Heliocentric radial velocity: 3583±4 km/s
- Distance: 159 ± 11 Mly (48.6 ± 3.4 Mpc)
- Apparent magnitude (V): 12.4
- Apparent magnitude (B): 13.2
- Surface brightness: 12.6

Characteristics
- Type: (R')SB(s)bc; Sy2; H II
- Apparent size (V): 2.40′ × 0.6′
- Notable features: Position angle: 170°; galaxy group: LDCE 78

Other designations
- IRAS 1117-3254, 2MASX J01140701-3239032, IC 1657/1663, MCG -06-03-030, PGC 4440

IC 1657 (also known as IC 1663) is an active barred spiral galaxy with extended star-forming regions of the Hubble type SBbc in the constellation of Sculptor in the southern sky. It is estimated to be about 159 million light-years from the Milky Way and has a diameter of approximately 115,000 light-years.

In the same region of the sky lie, among others, the galaxies NGC 427, NGC 439, and NGC 441.

The object was discovered on 4 September 1897 by Lewis Swift.

== Supernovae ==
Two supernovae have been observed in IC 1657:

- SN 2012hd (Type Ia, mag. 16.4) was discovered by Stu Parker on 20 November 2012.
- SN 2016gfk (Type Ia, mag. 17) was discovered by Stu Parker on 11 September 2016.
