= NGC 544 =

Galaxy in the constellation Sculptor

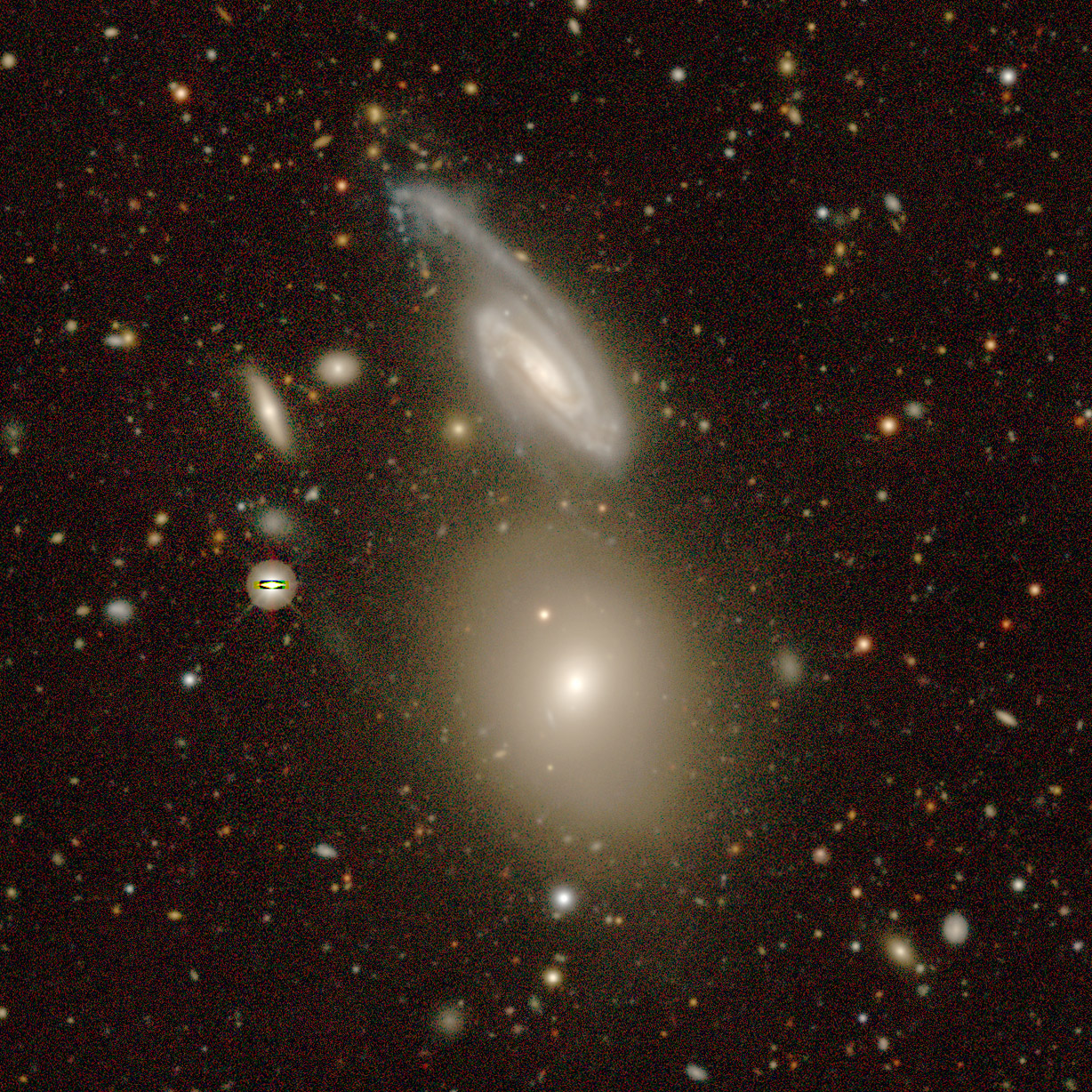
- An image of NGC 544, which is just south of NGC 546

Observation data (J2000 epoch)
- Constellation: Sculptor
- Right ascension: 01^{h} 25^{m} 12.02^{s}
- Declination: −38° 21′ 15.87″
- Redshift: 0.020034
- Heliocentric radial velocity: 5946 km/s

Characteristics
- Apparent size (V): 1.5 × 1.1 arcmin

Other designations
- GC 320, h 2411

NGC 544 (also known as GC 320 or h 2411) is a faint, small, and round elliptical galaxy located in the constellation Sculptor. The galaxy was discovered by John Herschel on 23 October 1835 and its apparent size is 1.5 by 1.1 arc minutes. It is approximately 360 million light years away from Earth, it is similar to those of NGC 534, NGC 546 and NGC 549.
