= NGC 630 =

Galaxy in the constellation of Sculptor

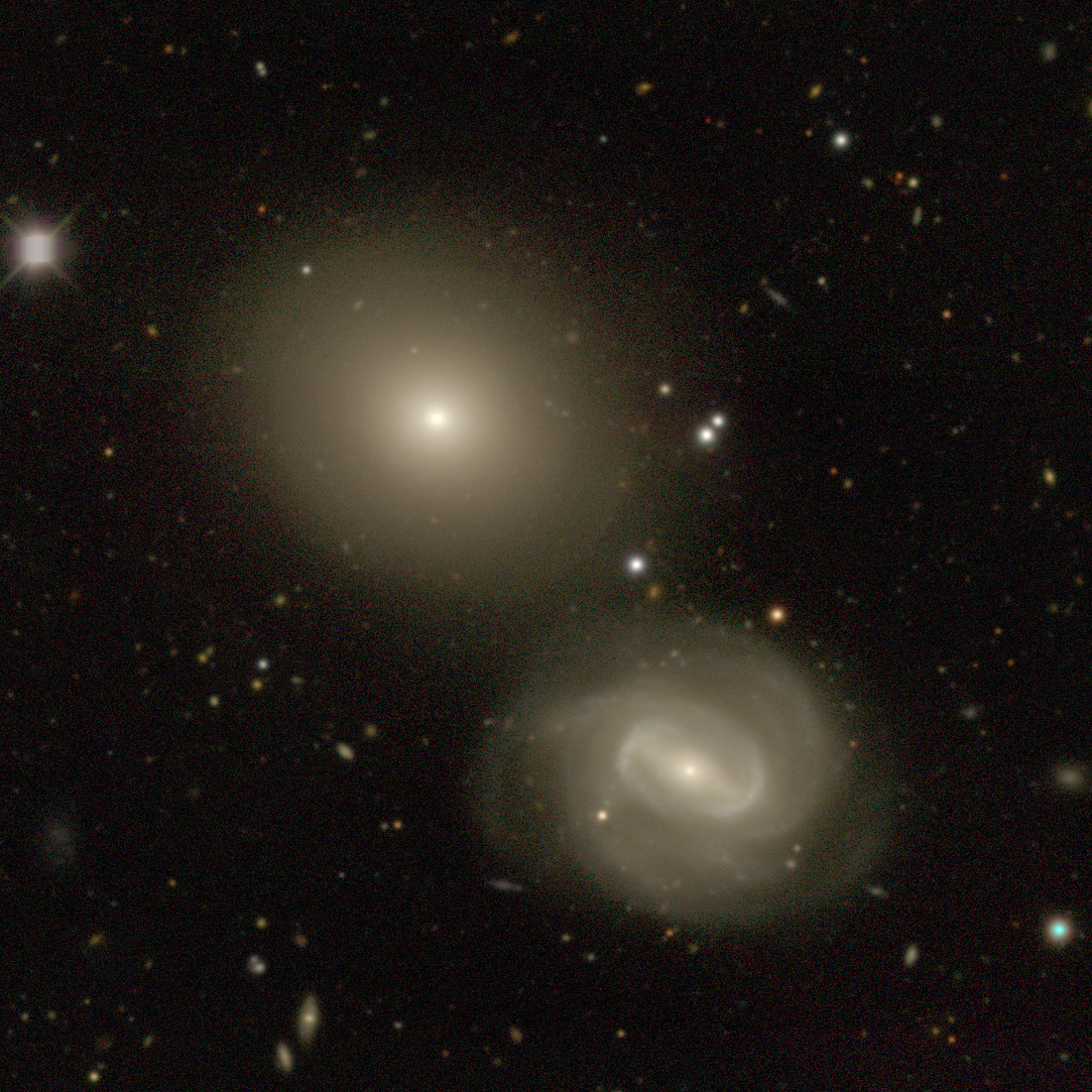
- NGC 630 (left) and ESO 297-8 (right) with DECam

Observation data (J2000 epoch)
- Constellation: Sculptor
- Right ascension: 01^{h} 35^{m} 36.475^{s}
- Declination: −39° 21′ 28.39″
- Redshift: 0.01976±0.00006
- Heliocentric radial velocity: 5,923.90±18.89
- Distance: 275.2 ± 19.3 Mly (84.39 ± 5.92 Mpc)

Characteristics
- Type: SA0^{−}(rs):

Other designations
- ESO 297-9, PGC 5924

NGC 630 is an elliptical galaxy in the constellation Sculptor. It is estimated to be 275 million light years from the Milky Way and has a diameter of approximately 125,000 light years. The object was discovered on October 23, 1835 by the English astronomer John Herschel.
