= NGC 546 =

Galaxy in the constellation Sculptor

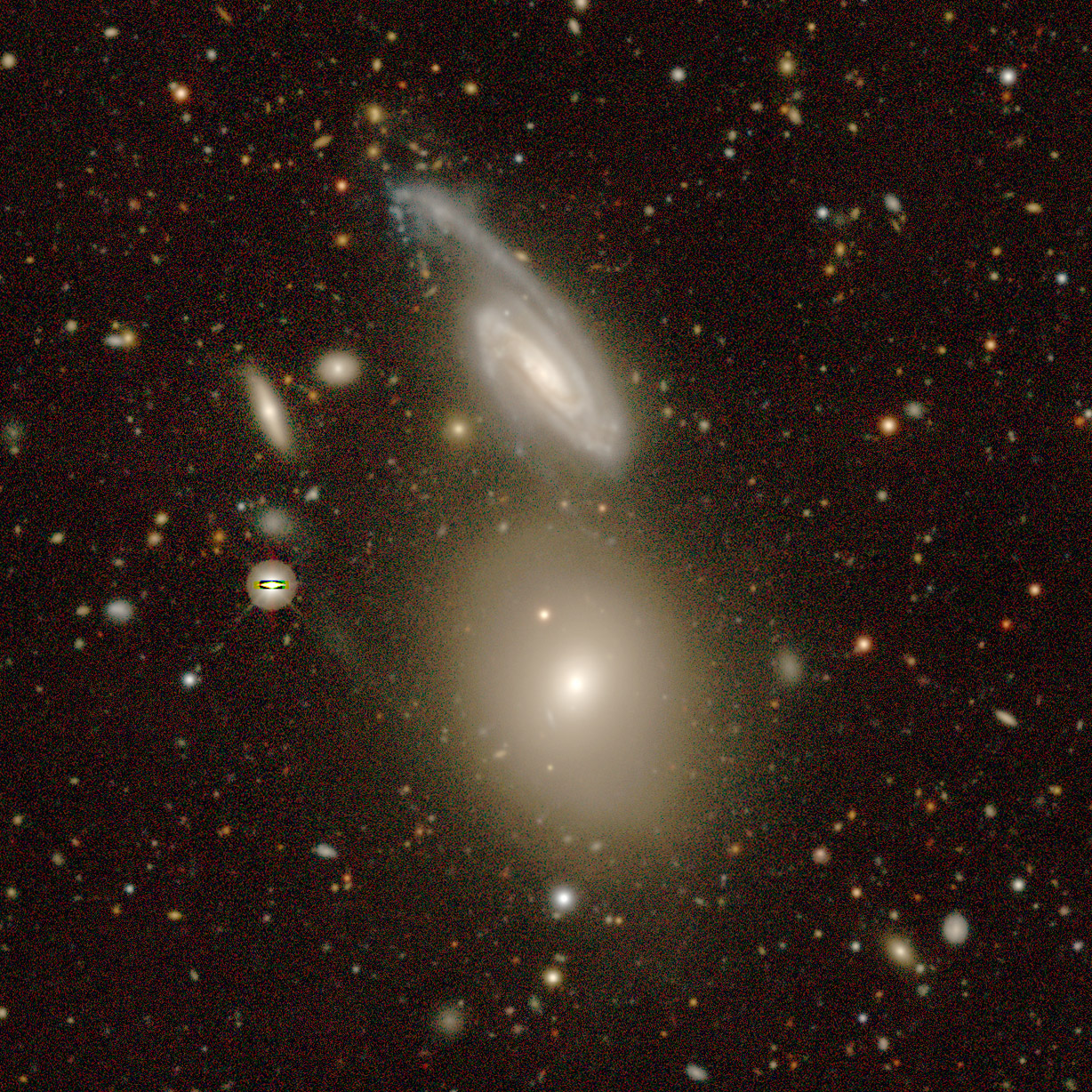
- legacy surveys image of NGC 546 (top) and NGC 544 (bottom)

Observation data (J2000 epoch)
- Constellation: Sculptor
- Right ascension: 01^{h} 25^{m} 12.809^{s}
- Declination: −38° 04′ 08.50″
- Redshift: 0.021922
- Heliocentric radial velocity: 6500 km/s
- Distance: 266.34 ± 0.65 Mly (81.66 ± 0.20 Mpc)
- Apparent magnitude (B): 14.48

Characteristics
- Type: SB(s)b: pec

Other designations
- MCG -06-04-029, PGC 5255

NGC 546 (also known as ESO 296-25, IRAS 01229-3819, MCG −6-4-29 and PGC 5255) is a barred spiral galaxy about 270 million light years away from Earth and located in the constellation Sculptor. The largest diameter is 1.40 (122 thousand light years) and the smallest is 0.5 angular minutes (43 thousand light years). The first discovery was made by John Frederick William Herschel on 23 October 1835.
