= NGC 633 =

Large barred spiral galaxy in the constellation Sculptor

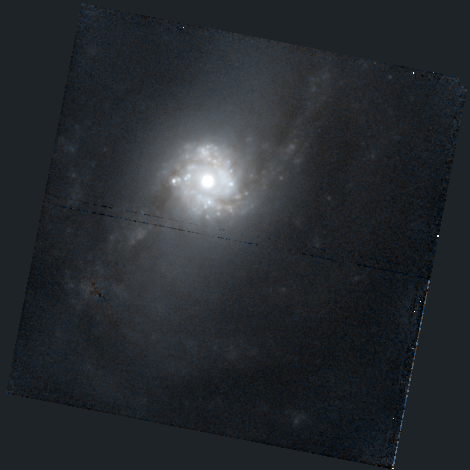
- The galaxy, as seen by the Hubble Space Telescope

Observation data (J2000 epoch)
- Constellation: Sculptor
- Right ascension: 01^{h} 36^{m} 23.4128^{s}
- Declination: −37° 19′ 17.647″
- Redshift: 0.017305
- Heliocentric radial velocity: 5188 ± 11 km/s
- Apparent magnitude (B): 13.5
- Surface brightness: 22.37 mag/arcsec^{2}

Characteristics
- Type: SB(r)b:

Other designations
- MCG -06-04-056, PGC 5960

NGC 633 is a large barred spiral galaxy located in the constellation Sculptor. Its speed relative to the cosmic microwave background is 4,979 ± 18 km/s, which corresponds to a Hubble distance of 73.4 ± 5.2 Mpc (~239 million ly). NGC 633 was discovered by British astronomer John Herschel in 1834.

The luminosity class of NGC 633 is II and it has a broad HI line. It also contains regions of ionized hydrogen.

The smaller galaxy to the south of NGC 633 is PGC 5959 or ESO 297-012, and these two galaxies form a galactic pair. The Hubble distance of ESO 297-012 is 73.51 ± 5.15, which is almost identical to that of NGC 633, confirming that both galaxies are in gravitational interaction. A contrast-enhanced image shows a bridge of matter between these two galaxies.

== See also ==
- List of NGC objects (1–1000)
