= NGC 7507 =

Elliptical galaxy in the constellation Sculptor

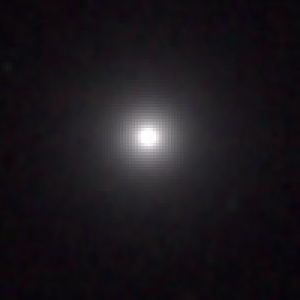
- NGC 7507 (2MASS)

Observation data (J2000 epoch)
- Constellation: Sculptor
- Right ascension: 23^{h} 12^{m} 07.595^{s}
- Declination: −28° 32′ 22.70″
- Redshift: 0.005260±0.000100
- Heliocentric radial velocity: 1,590±21 km/s
- Distance: 80.07 ± 0.46 Mly (24.55 ± 0.14 Mpc)
- Apparent magnitude (V): 10.6
- Apparent magnitude (B): 11.60

Characteristics
- Type: E0
- Mass: 2×10^{11} M_{☉}
- Size: 91 kly
- Apparent size (V): 1.987′ × 1.907′ (NIR)

Other designations
- NGC 7507, LEDA 70676, MCG -05-54-022; ESO 469-19, AM 2309-284

NGC 7507 is an elliptical galaxy located in the constellation Sculptor. It was discovered by the German-British astronomer William Herschel on October 30, 1783. The galaxy lies at an estimated distance of 80.1 million light-years (24.55 Mpc) from the Milky Way, and has an angular size of 2.0′ × 1.9′ in the near infrared. It is receding with a heliocentric radial velocity of 1,590 km/s.

The morphological classification of NGC 7507 is E0, indicating an elliptical galaxy with an almost perfectly circular profile. This massive galaxy is fairly isolated, although it forms a pair with the barred spiral galaxy NGC 7513. The latter lies at a projected angular separation of 18′. Apart from a central dust lane, NGC 7507 displays neither shells nor tidal features. The stellar halo has two components, with the outer and inner halos counter-rotating.

It is unusual galaxy in that it displays a negligible dark matter profile, showing a constant mass to light ratio. This apparent lack of a dark matter component is difficult to explain in an LCDM cosmology. The globular cluster population around NGC 7507 is very small, being only a tenth the size of other comparable ellipticals. It more closely resembles the globular population of a spiral galaxy.

== Gallery ==
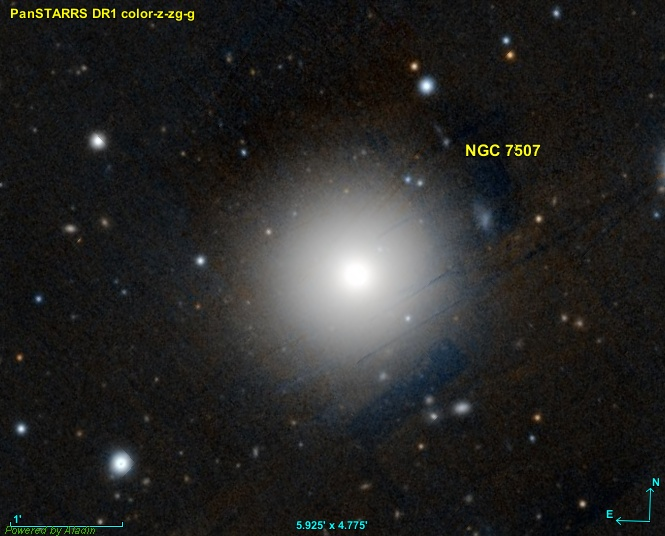
Pan-STARRS image of NGC 7507
