= NGC 7513 =

Galaxy in the constellation Sculptor

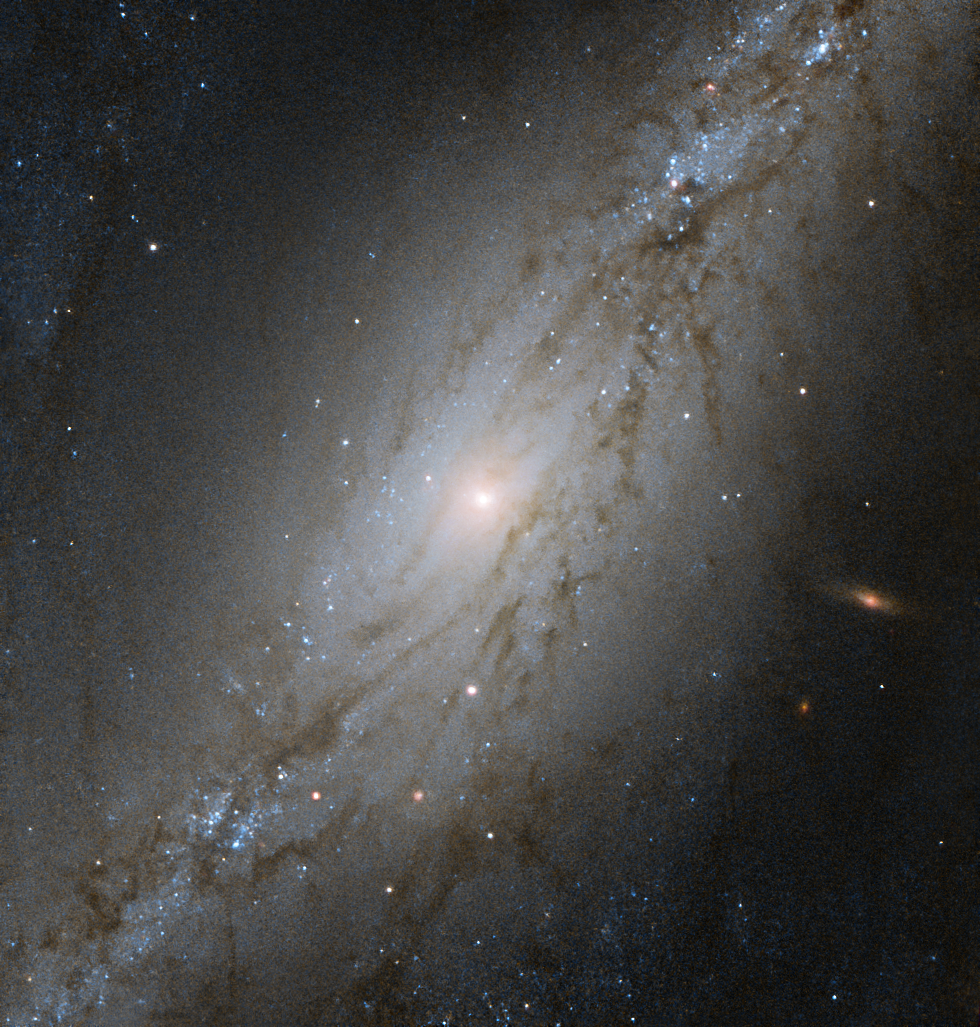
- NGC 7513 by Hubble Space Telescope

Observation data (J2000 epoch)
- Constellation: Sculptor
- Right ascension: 23^{h} 13^{m} 14.0^{s}
- Declination: −28° 21′ 27″
- Redshift: 0.005217 ± 0.000013
- Heliocentric radial velocity: 1,564 ± 4 km/s
- Distance: 62.4 ± 6.4 Mly (19.1 ± 2.0 Mpc)
- Apparent magnitude (V): 11.3

Characteristics
- Type: (R')SB(s)b pec
- Apparent size (V): 3.2′ × 2.1′

Other designations
- UGCA 437, ESO 469- G022, AM 2310-283B, MCG -05-54-023, PGC 70714

NGC 7513 is a barred spiral galaxy located in the constellation Sculptor. It is located at a distance of circa 62.5 million light years from Earth, which, given its apparent dimensions, means that NGC 7513 is about 75,000 light years across. It was discovered by Albert Marth on September 24, 1864.

A large star cluster has been found in the nucleus, with an estimated mass of 10^{7.0} M_{☉}. There is circumnuclear dust distributed irregularly.

NGC 7513 is a member of the NGC 7507 galaxy group, named after NGC 7507, along with some smaller galaxies. NGC 7507 is an elliptical galaxy lying at a projected distance of 18 arcminutes.
