= IC 5332 =

Spiral Galaxy in the constellation Sculptor

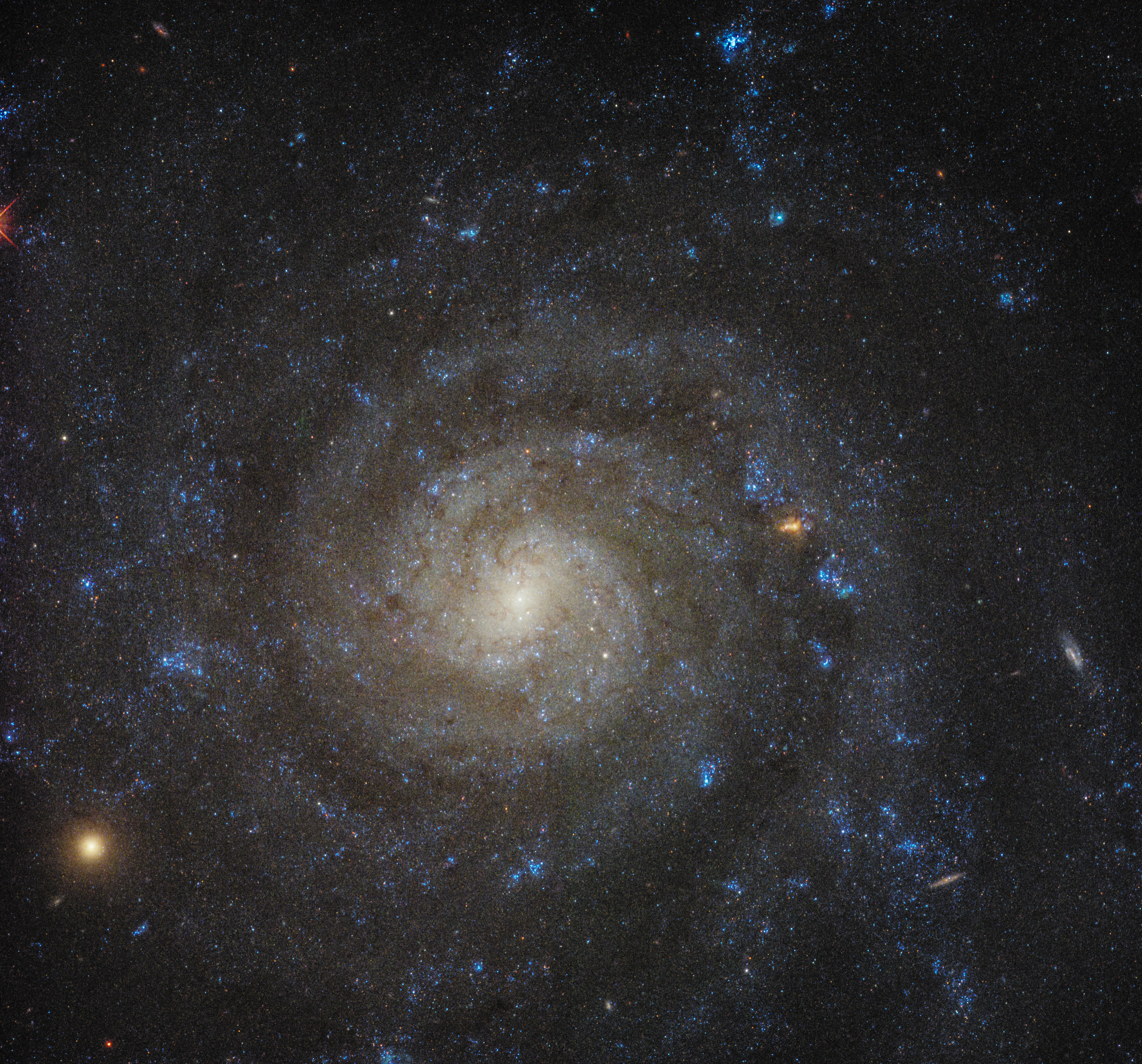
- IC 5332 imaged by the Hubble Space Telescope

Observation data (J2000 epoch)
- Constellation: Sculptor
- Right ascension: 23^{h} 34^{m} 27.5673^{s}
- Declination: −36° 06′ 03.728″
- Redshift: 0.002338±0.000006
- Heliocentric radial velocity: 701 ± 1 km/s
- Distance: 28.8 Mly (8.84 Mpc)
- Group or cluster: IC 5332 Group (LGG 478)
- Apparent magnitude (V): 10.72

Characteristics
- Type: SABc
- Size: ~60,800 ly (18.64 kpc) (estimated)
- Apparent size (V): 7.8′ × 6.2′

Other designations
- ESO 408- G 009, IRAS F23318-3622, MCG -06-51-012, PGC 71775

IC 5332, also known as PGC 71775, is an intermediate spiral galaxy about 30 million light-years away in the constellation Sculptor. It was discovered by American astronomer Lewis Swift on 19 November 1897. IC 5332 is too faint to be visible to the naked eye, with an apparent magnitude of 10.72. Viewed from earth, it is nearly face on. It has a very small central bulge and open spiral arms accounting for its SABc classification. The galaxy lies in the direction of the galactic south pole.

IC 5332 imaged by the JWST observatory with its MIRI instrument

IC 5332 is a late type spiral galaxy with observable star formation ongoing, though at such a low rate as to be a stable non-starburst galaxy. It is a somewhat tenuous spiral galaxy with a very low surface brightness of just 23.8 mag/squ arc sec.

IC 5332 has also been observed in detail by the James Webb Space Telescope's Mid-InfraRed Instrument (MIRI). MIRI's high-resolution mid-infrared image pierced the dust clouds obscuring the galaxy's spiral arms, revealing the galaxy's structures in high detail. These structures were previously hidden in both visible and ultraviolet light observations.

== IC 5332 Group ==
According to A.M. Garcia, IC 5332 is the namesake of the IC 5332 galaxy group (also known as LGG 478). This small group has three galaxies, including NGC 7713 and PGC 72525.

== See also ==
- List of IC objects
- List of galaxies
- List of nearest galaxies
- List of spiral galaxies
