= NGC 7713 =

Barred spiral galaxy in the constellation Sculptor

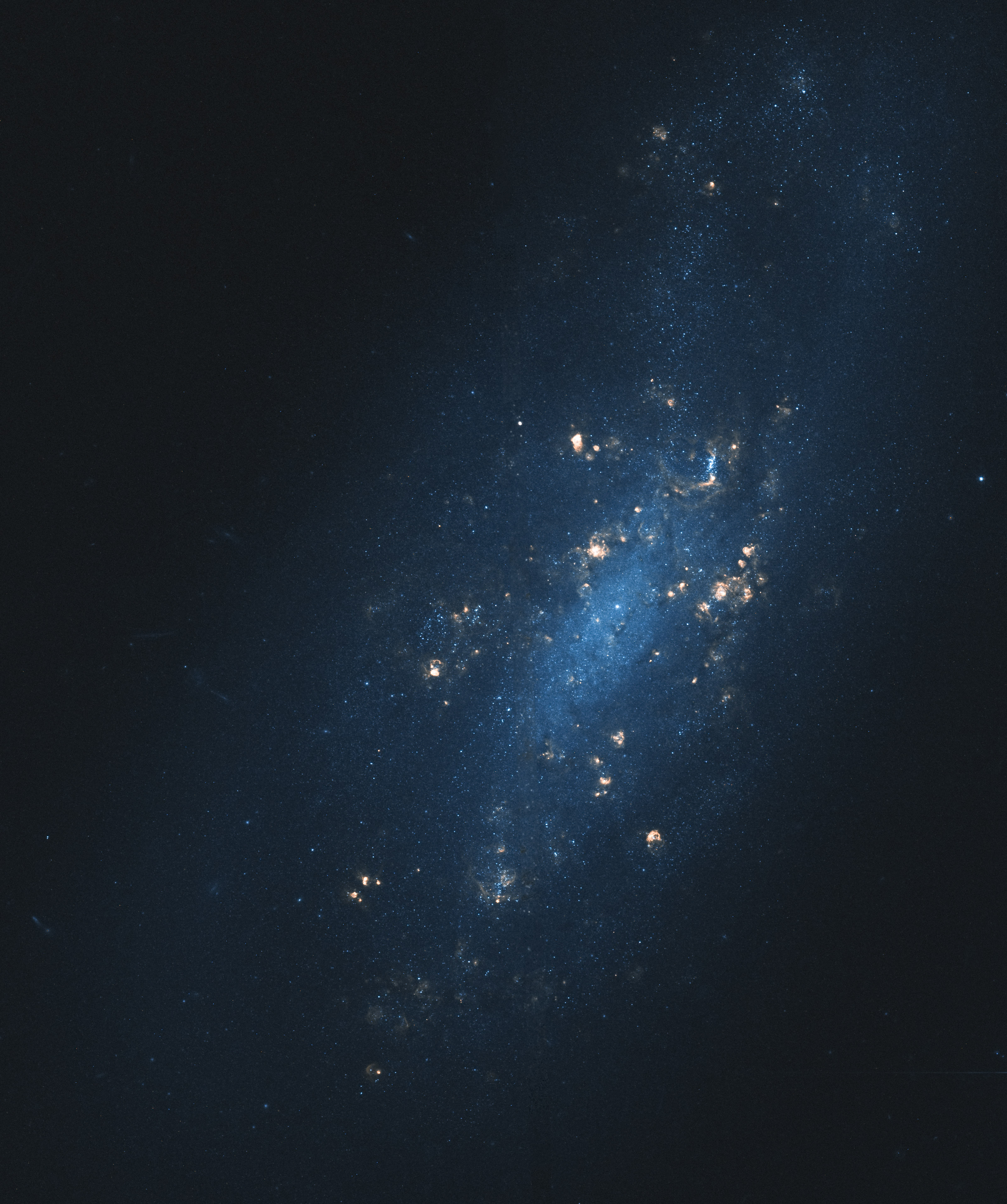
- NGC 7713 imaged by the Hubble Space Telescope

Observation data (J2000 epoch)
- Constellation: Sculptor
- Right ascension: 23^{h} 36^{m} 14.9900^{s}
- Declination: −37° 56′ 17.100″
- Distance: 29.52 ± 0.94 Mly (9.051 ± 0.288 Mpc)
- Group or cluster: IC 5332 Group (LGG 478)
- Apparent magnitude (B): 11.63
- Surface brightness: 22.97 mag/arcsec2

Characteristics
- Type: SB(r)d?
- Size: ~51,500 ly (15.80 kpc) (estimated)
- Apparent size (V): 4.5′ × 1.8′

Other designations
- ESO 347-028, 2MASX J23361515-3756221, MCG -06-51-013, PGC 71866

NGC 7713 is a barred spiral galaxy with extensive Hubble-type SBcd star-forming regions that is located in the constellation Sculptor in the southern sky. It is estimated to be 31 million light-years from the Milky Way and about 40,000 light-years in diameter. It was discovered by John Herschel on October 4, 1836.

== Supernova ==
One supernova has been observed in NGC 7713: SN 1982L (Type II, mag. 16) was discovered by Marina Wischnjewsky on 21 July 1982.

== IC 5332 Group ==
According to A.M. Garcia, NGC 7713 is a member of the IC 5332 galaxy group (also known as LGG 478). This small group has three galaxies, including IC 5332 and PGC 72525.

== See also ==
- List of NGC objects (7001–7840)
