= NGC 314 =

Galaxy in the constellation of Sculptor

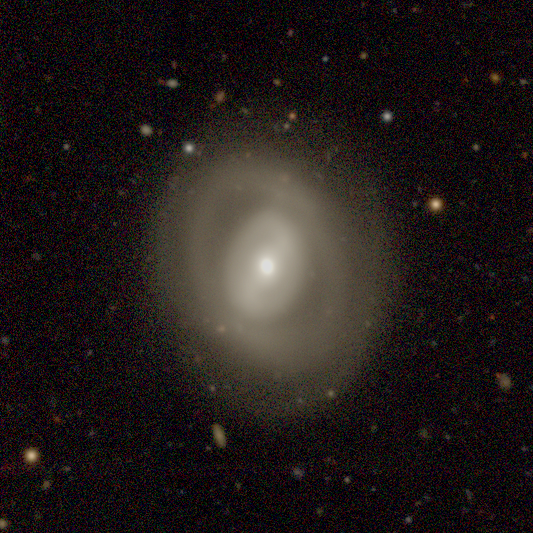
- NGC 314 seen by DECam

Observation data (J2000 epoch)
- Constellation: Sculptor
- Right ascension: 00^{h} 56^{m} 52.4^{s}
- Declination: −31° 57′ 47″
- Redshift: 0.018730
- Heliocentric radial velocity: 5,615 km/s
- Apparent magnitude (V): 14.59

Characteristics
- Type: SB0
- Apparent size (V): 1.0' × 0.8'

Other designations
- ESO 411- G 032, MCG -05-03-015, 2MASX J00565241-3157466, 2MASXi J00560524-315746, IRAS 00544-3214, F00544-3214, ESO-LV 4110320, PGC 3395.

NGC 314 is a lenticular galaxy in the constellation Sculptor. It was discovered on September 27, 1834 by John Herschel.
