= NGC 424 =

Galaxy in the constellation of Sculptor

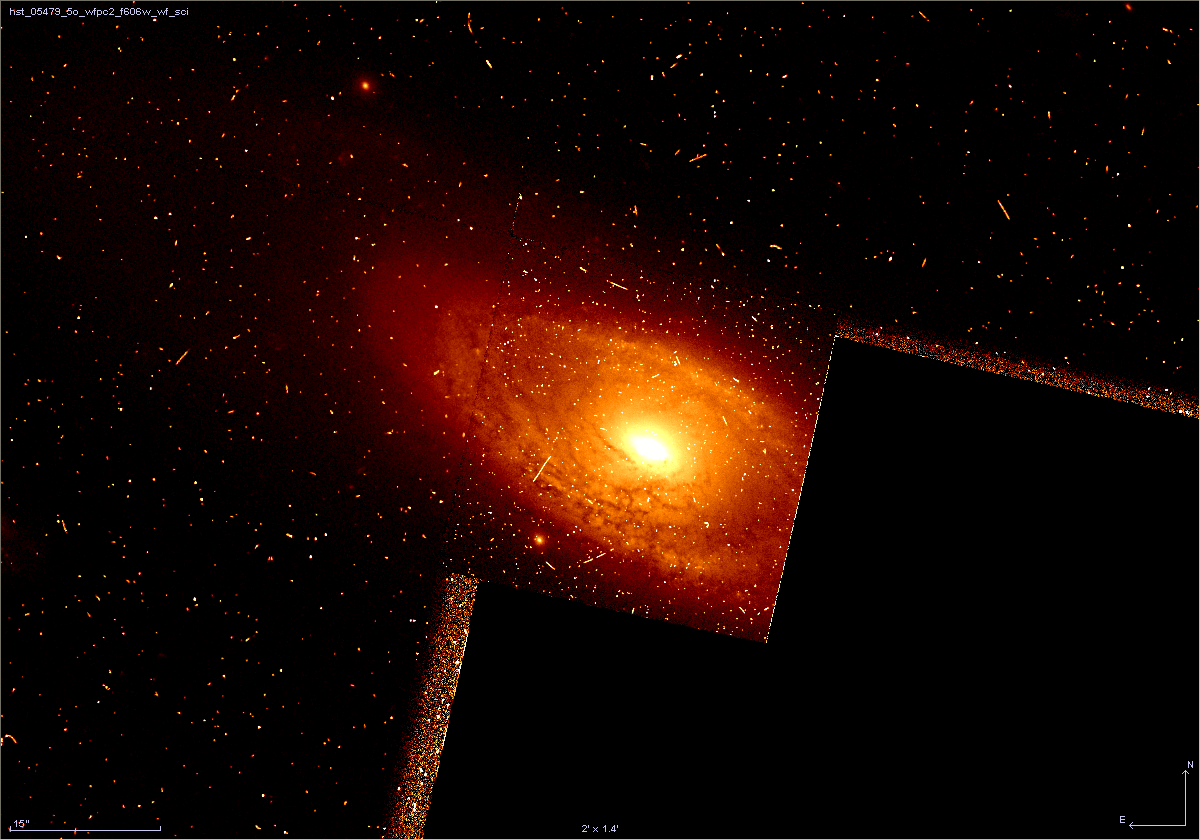
- NGC 424 imaged by the Hubble Space Telescope

Observation data (J2000 epoch)
- Constellation: Sculptor
- Right ascension: 01^{h} 11^{m} 27.6390^{s}
- Declination: −38° 05′ 00.452″
- Redshift: 0.011764
- Heliocentric radial velocity: 3,527 km/s
- Distance: 165.36 ± 24.14 Mly (50.700 ± 7.400 Mpc)
- Apparent magnitude (V): 12.9

Characteristics
- Type: Sa
- Size: ~134,600 ly (41.26 kpc) (estimated)
- Apparent size (V): 2.3′ × 0.8′

Other designations
- ESO 296- G 004, IRAS 01091-3820, MCG -06-03-026, PGC 4274

NGC 424 is a spiral galaxy in the constellation of Sculptor. Its velocity with respect to the cosmic microwave background is 3,303±18 km/s, which corresponds to a Hubble distance of 158.9 ± 11.2 Mly (48.72 ± 3.42 Mpc). Also, two non-redshift measurements give a similar mean distance of 165.36 ± 24.14 Mly (50.700 ± 7.400 Mpc). It was discovered by British astronomer John Herschel on November 30, 1837.

NGC 424 is a Seyfert I galaxy, i.e. it has a quasar-like nucleus with very high surface brightnesses whose spectra reveal strong, high-ionisation emission lines, but unlike quasars, the host galaxy is clearly detectable. Other sources state NGC 424 to be a Seyfert II galaxy.

== Supernova ==
One supernova has been observed in NGC 424: SN 2025scw (Type II, mag. 16.924) was discovered by ATLAS on 24 July 2025.

== Gallery ==
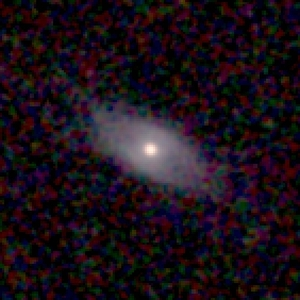
NGC 424 imaged by 2MASS

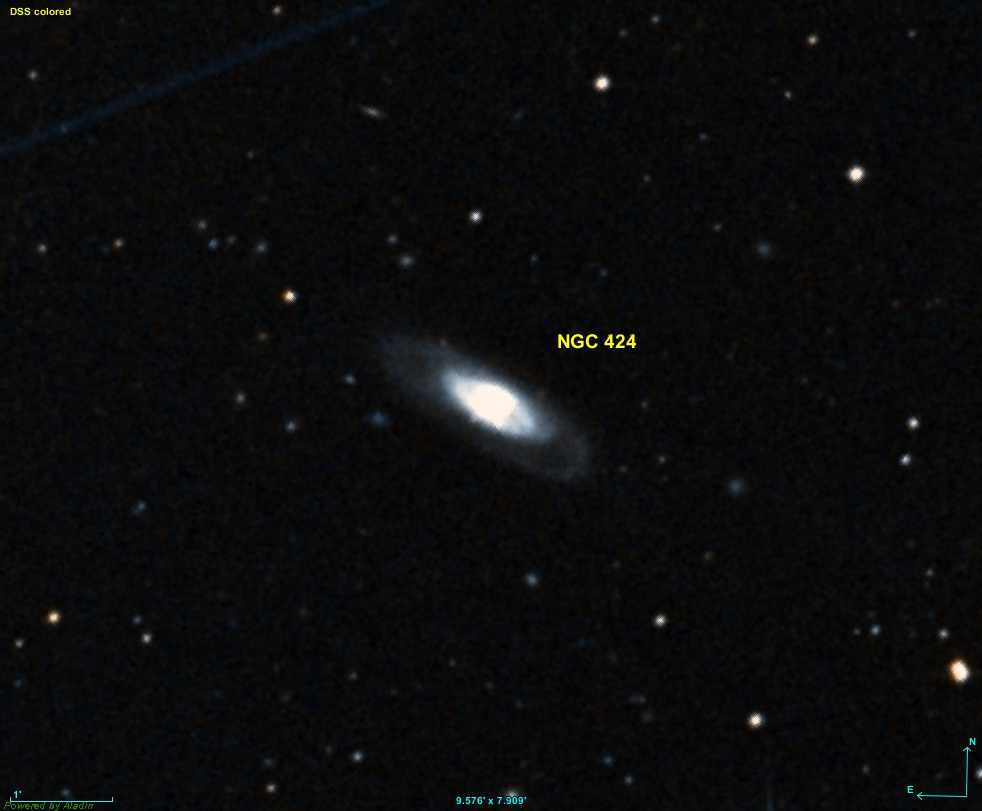
NGC 424 imaged by DSS

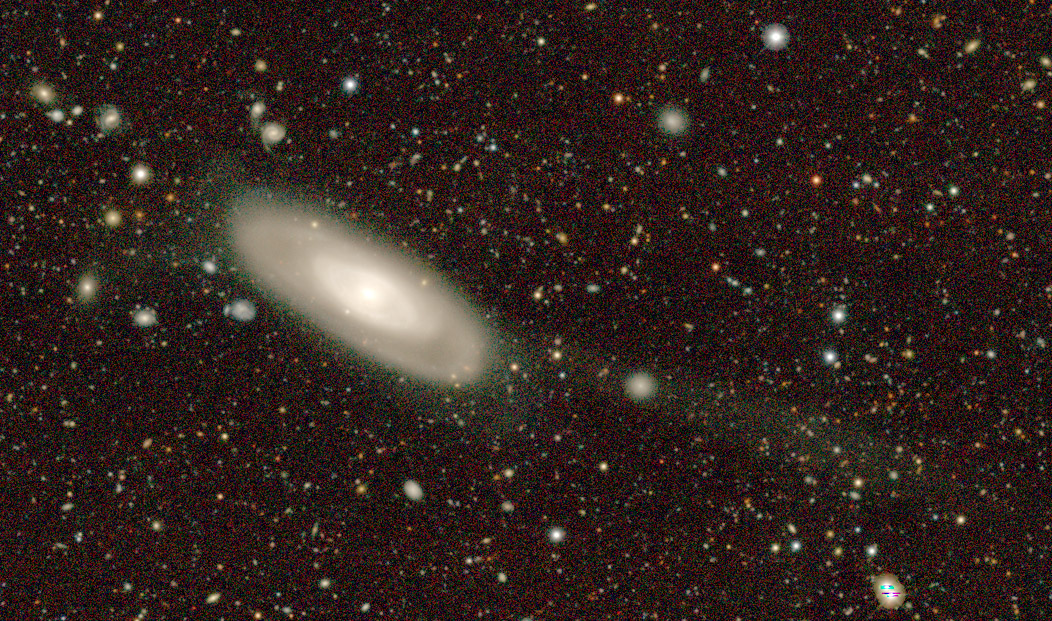
NGC 424 imaged by legacy surveys, showing that this galaxy has a tidal structure

== See also ==
- List of NGC objects (1–1000)
