= NGC 527 =

Galaxy in the constellation Sculptor

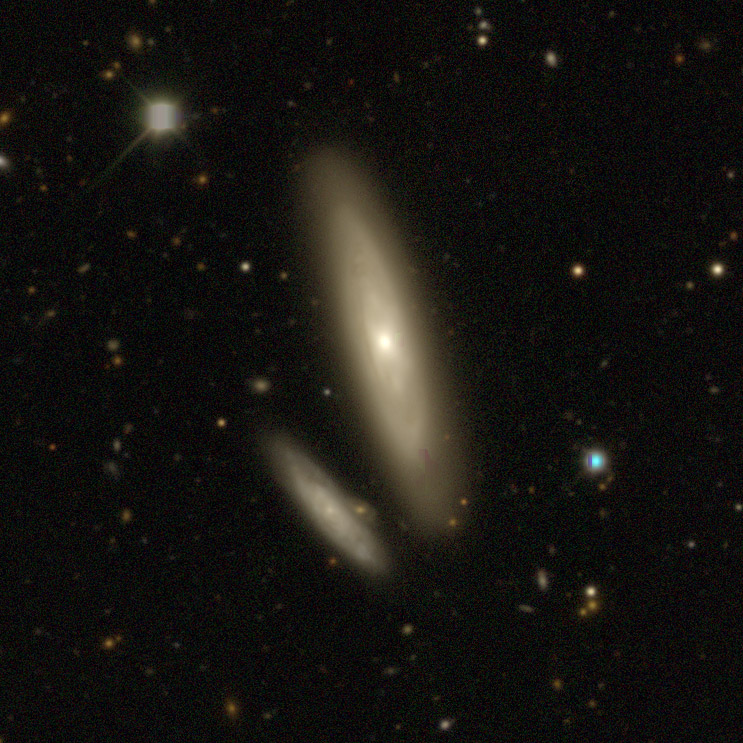
- NGC 527 as seen by DECam

Observation data (J2000 epoch)
- Constellation: Sculptor
- Right ascension: 01^{h} 23^{m} 58.0^{s}
- Declination: −35° 06′ 55″
- Redshift: 0.019243 ± 0.000057
- Heliocentric radial velocity: (5713 ± 17) km/s
- Distance: 259 Mly
- Apparent magnitude (V): 13.2
- Apparent magnitude (B): 14.1

Characteristics
- Type: SB0-a
- Apparent size (V): 1.6' × 0.3'

Other designations
- PGC 5128, PGC 5141, GC 310, MGC -06-04-021, 2MASS J01235812-3506545, h 2409

NGC 527, also occasionally referred to as PGC 5128 or PGC 5141, is a lenticular galaxy located approximately 259 million light-years from the Solar System in the constellation Sculptor. It was discovered on 1 September 1834 by astronomer John Herschel.

== Observation history ==
Herschel discovered the object along with NGC 526. The object was later catalogued by John Louis Emil Dreyer in the New General Catalogue, where the galaxy was described as "faint, small, a little extended, brighter middle, the following (eastern) of 2" with the other one being NGC 526.

== Description ==
The galaxy has an apparent visual magnitude of 13.2 and can be classified as type SB0-a using the Hubble Sequence. The object's distance of roughly 260 million light-years from the Solar System can be estimated using its redshift and Hubble's law.

== Companion galaxy PGC 5142 ==
NGC 527 has a much dimmer magnitude 14 companion galaxy (PGC 5142). Although this galaxy is not an NGC object, it is sometimes referred to as NGC 527B. The galaxy has an apparent size of 1.6' × 0.3' and a recessional velocity of approximately 5880 km/s.

== See also ==
- List of NGC objects (1–1000)
