= NGC 264 =

Lenticular galaxy in the constellation of Sculptor

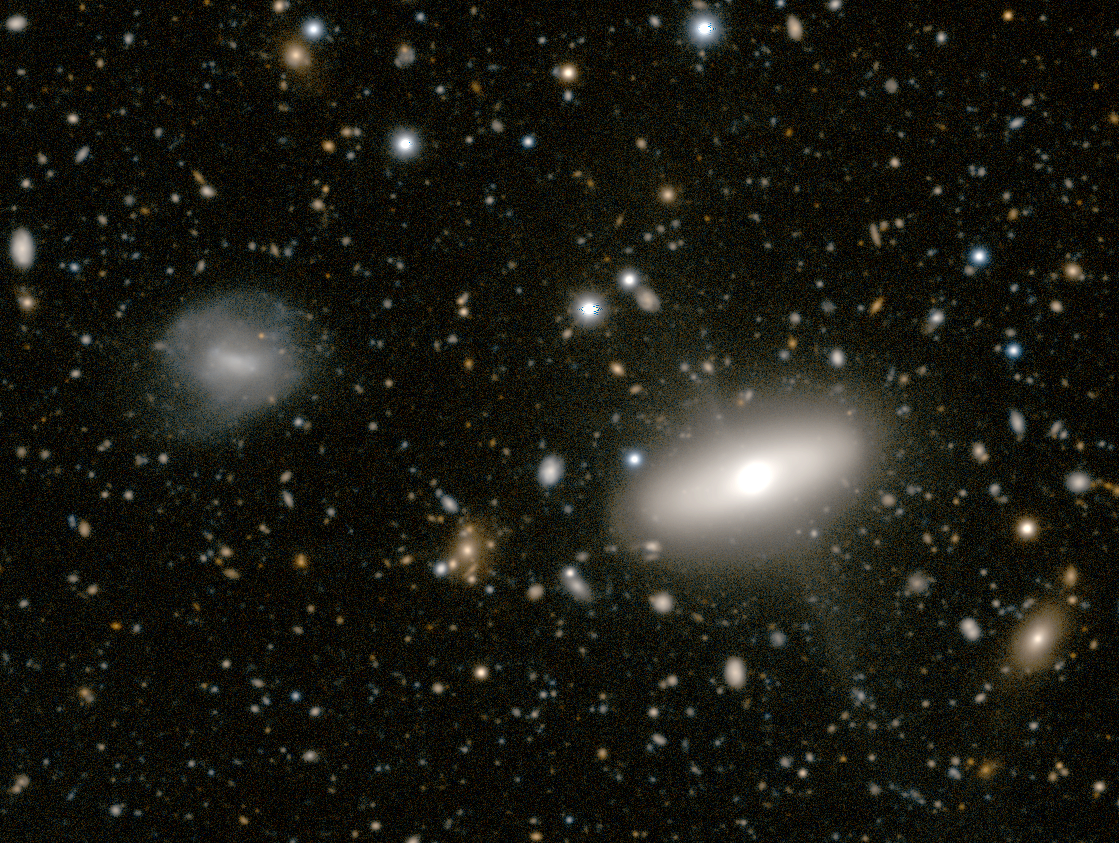
- DECam image of NGC 264 (right). The galaxy to the left is LEDA 611463

Observation data (J2000 epoch)
- Constellation: Sculptor
- Right ascension: 00^{h} 48^{m} 20.9^{s}
- Declination: −38° 14′ 04″
- Redshift: 0.016635
- Apparent magnitude (V): 14.60

Characteristics
- Type: S0
- Apparent size (V): 1.18' × 0.45'

Other designations
- ESO 295- G 006, MCG -07-02-016, 2MASX J00482094-3814038, ESO-LV 2950060, 6dF J0048208-381404, PGC 2831.

NGC 264 is a lenticular galaxy located in the constellation Sculptor. It was discovered on August 30, 1834 by John Herschel.
