= NGC 526 =

Pair of interacting galaxies in the constellation of Sculptor

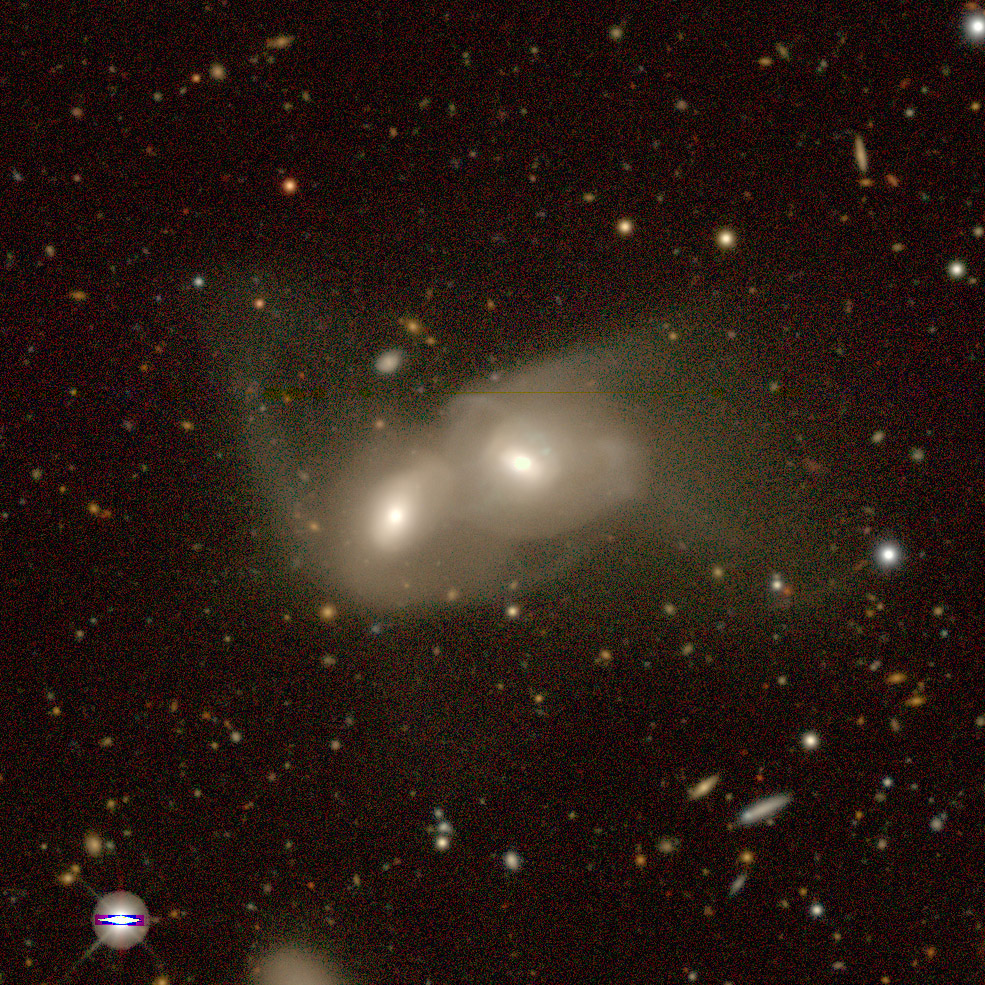
- legacy surveys image of NGC 526

Observation data (J2000 epoch)
- Constellation: Sculptor
- Right ascension: 01^{h} 23^{m} 58.5^{s}
- Declination: −35° 07′ 21″
- Redshift: 0.019220
- Heliocentric radial velocity: 5762 km/h
- Galactocentric velocity: 5713 km/h
- Distance: 91.4 ± 6.4 Mpc (298.1 ± 18.0 Mly)
- Apparent magnitude (V): 14.71

Characteristics
- Type: S0?
- Apparent size (V): 1.6' x 0.3'

Other designations
- ESO 352-IG 066, ESO 012138-3519.7, PGC 5120

NGC 526 is a pair of interacting lenticular galaxies in the constellation of Sculptor. Both the constituents are classified as S0 lenticular galaxies. This pair was first discovered by John Herschel on September 1, 1834. Dreyer, the compiler of the catalogue described the galaxy as "faint, small, a little extended, the preceding of 2", the other object being NGC 527.

== See also ==
- List of NGC objects (1–1000)
