= NGC 378 =

Galaxy in the constellation of Sculptor

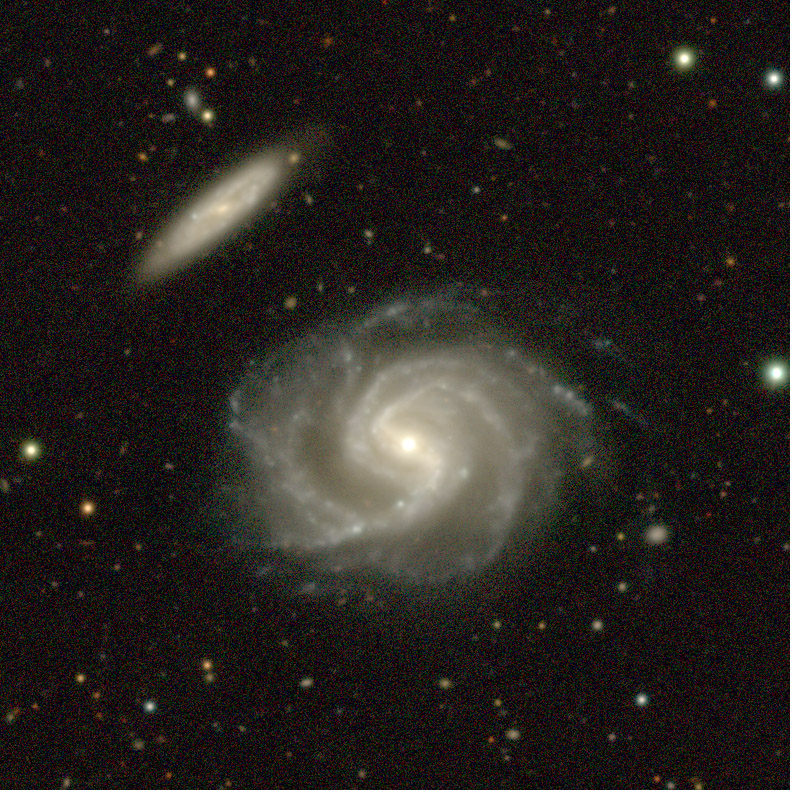
- Spiral galaxy NGC 378 with DECam. The galaxy on the upper left is LEDA 3913.

Observation data (J2000 epoch)
- Constellation: Sculptor
- Right ascension: 01^{h} 06^{m} 12.223^{s}
- Declination: 30° 10′ 41.17″
- Redshift: 0.032062
- Distance: 389 Mly (119.5 Mpc)
- Apparent magnitude (V): 13.1

Characteristics
- Type: SB(r)c
- Apparent size (V): 1.65′ × 1.3′

Other designations
- PGC 3907, AM 0103-302, ESO 412-5, IRAS 01038-3026, MCG -5-3-24

NGC 378 is a barred spiral galaxy located in the constellation Sculptor. It was discovered on September 28, 1834 by John Herschel.
