= NGC 439 =

Lenticular galaxy in the constellation of Sculptor

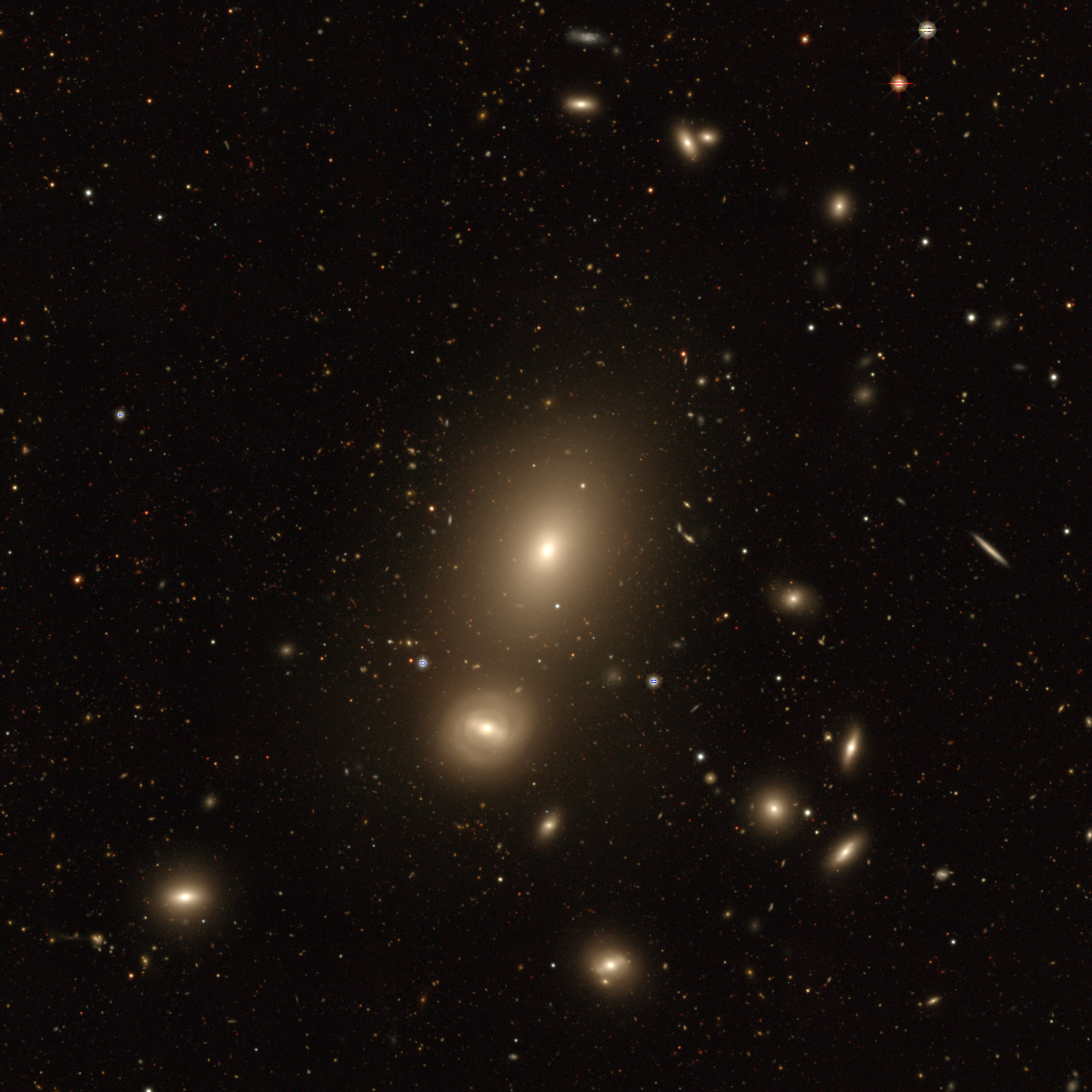
- NGC 439 (large galaxy in the middle) and NGC 441 (below NGC 439) by legacy surveys

Observation data (J2000 epoch)
- Constellation: Sculptor
- Right ascension: 01^{h} 13^{m} 47.2^{s}
- Declination: −31° 44′ 50″
- Redshift: 0.019357
- Heliocentric radial velocity: 5,803 km/s
- Distance: 207.87 ± 39.76 Mly (63.733 ± 12.192 Mpc)
- Apparent magnitude (V): 12.59
- Absolute magnitude (V): -23.18

Characteristics
- Type: SAB0^-(rs)?
- Apparent size (V): 2.5' × 1.5'

Other designations
- ESO 412- G 018, MCG -05-04-015, 2MASX J01134725-3144500, 2MASXi J0113476-314450, ESO-LV 4120180, 6dF J0113472-314450, 6dFGSv 00684, PGC 4423.

NGC 439 is a lenticular galaxy of type SAB0^-(rs)? located in the constellation Sculptor. It was discovered on September 27, 1834 by John Herschel. It was described by Dreyer as "pretty bright, small, round, gradually brighter middle."
