= NGC 626 =

Galaxy in the constellation Sculptor

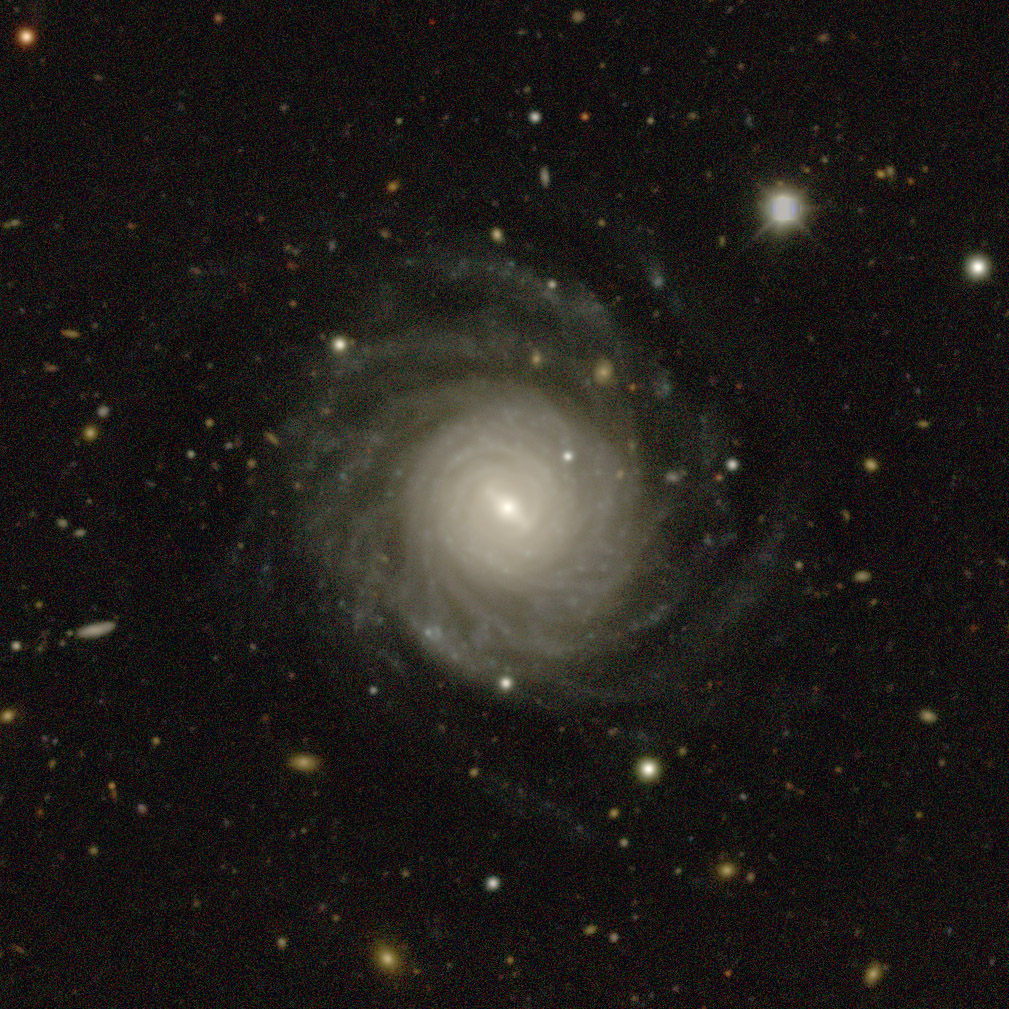
- NGC 626, photographed with the DECam

Observation data (J2000 epoch)
- Constellation: Sculptor
- Right ascension: 01h 35m 12s
- Declination: -39° 08′ 45″
- Apparent magnitude (B): 13.41
- Surface brightness: 14.13 mag/am2

Characteristics
- Type: SAc

Other designations
- PGC 5901, ESO 297-6, MCG -7-14-18

NGC 626 is a very large barred spiral galaxy located in the constellation Sculptor. Its speed relative to the cosmic microwave background is 5,475 ± 16 km/s, which corresponds to a Hubble distance of 80.8 ± 5.7 Mpc (~264 million ly). NGC 626 was discovered by British astronomer John Herschel in 1834.

The luminosity class of NGC 626 is III and it has a broad HI line.

NGC 626 has a surface brightness equal to 14.13 mag/am2, which classifies NGC 626 as a low surface brightness galaxy (LSB). LSB galaxies are diffuse (D) galaxies with a surface brightness less than one magnitude lower than that of the ambient night sky.

== Gallery ==
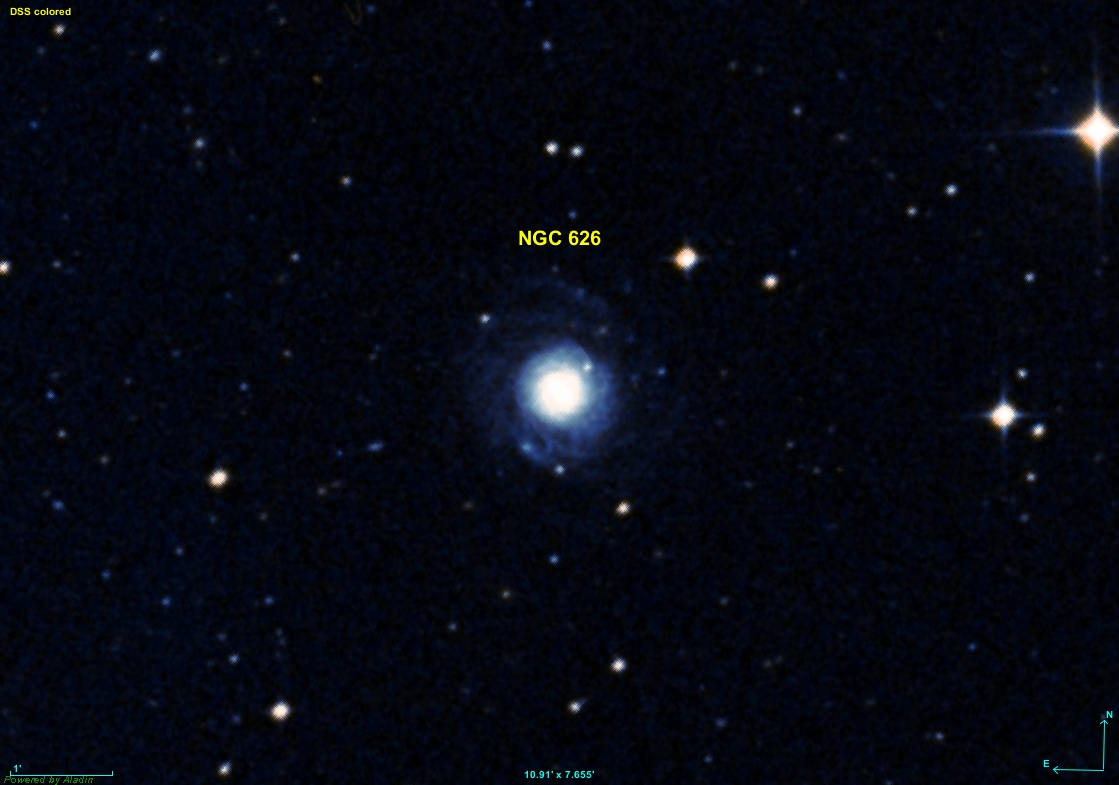

== See also ==
- List of NGC objects (1–1000)
- European Southern Observatory
