= NGC 438 =

Spiral galaxy in the constellation of Sculptor

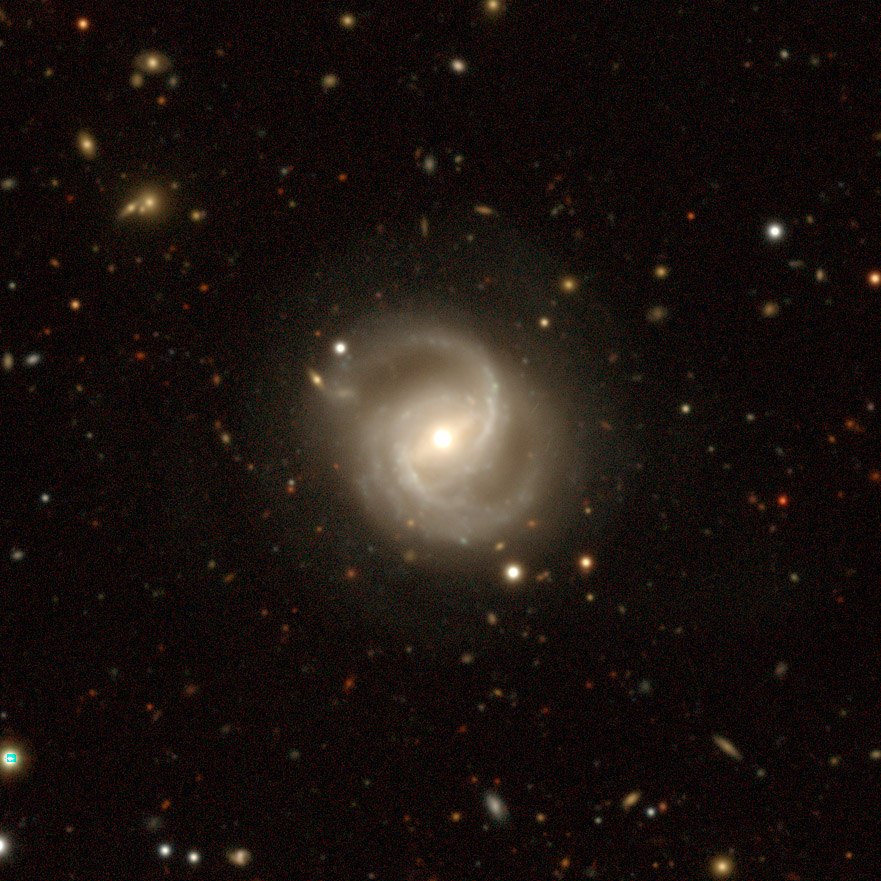
- NGC 438 imaged by legacy surveys

Observation data (J2000 epoch)
- Constellation: Sculptor
- Right ascension: 01^{h} 13^{m} 34.1^{s}
- Declination: −37° 54′ 06″
- Redshift: 0.011641
- Heliocentric radial velocity: 3,490 km/s
- Distance: 157.1 ± 11.1 Mly (48.18 ± 3.39 Mpc)
- Apparent magnitude (V): 13.42
- Absolute magnitude (V): -20.86

Characteristics
- Type: (R')SAB(s)b:
- Size: ~104,300 ly (31.98 kpc) (estimated)
- Apparent size (V): 1.4' × 1.1'

Other designations
- ESO-LV 2960070, ESO 296- G 007, IRAS 01112-3810, 2MASX J01133415-3754057, MCG -06-03-029, PGC 4406

NGC 438 is an intermediate spiral galaxy of type (R')SAB(s)b: located in the constellation Sculptor. It was discovered on September 1, 1834, by John Herschel. It was described by Dreyer as "pretty faint, small, round, gradually a little brighter middle."

One supernova has been observed in NGC 438: SN 2024vjc (type Ib, mag. 18.97).

== See also ==
- List of NGC objects (1–1000)
