= NGC 549 =

Galaxy in the constellation of Sculptor

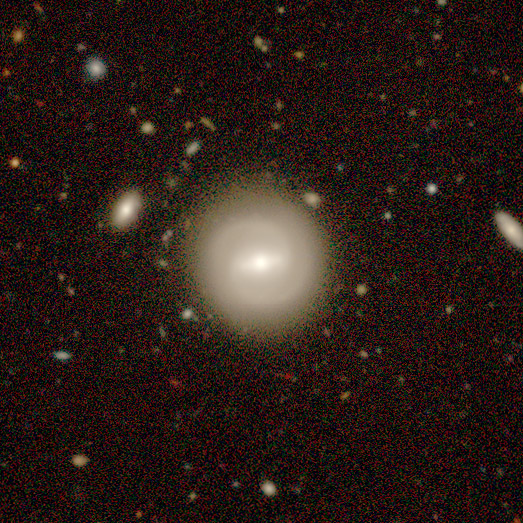
- legacy surveys view of NGC 549

Observation data (J2000 epoch)
- Constellation: Sculptor
- Right ascension: 01^{h} 25^{m} 07.1^{s}
- Declination: −38° 00′ 28″
- Redshift: 0.020734
- Heliocentric radial velocity: 6060
- Distance: 259.95 Mly (79.700 Mpc)

Characteristics
- Type: (R')SB(s)a

Other designations
- MCG -07-04-004, PGC 5278

NGC 549 is a barred spiral galaxy in the southern constellation Sculptor. It was discovered by British astronomer John Frederick William Herschel on November 29, 1837.
