= NGC 427 =

Galaxy in the constellation of Sculptor

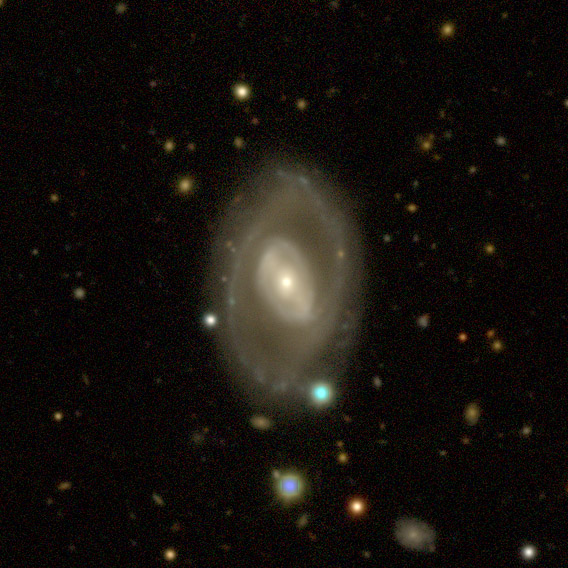
- NGC 427 as seen by DECam

Observation data (J2000 epoch)
- Constellation: Sculptor
- Right ascension: 01^{h} 12^{m} 19.2^{s}
- Declination: −32° 03′ 40″
- Redshift: 0.033897
- Heliocentric radial velocity: 10,162 km/s
- Apparent magnitude (V): 14.87
- Absolute magnitude (V): -22.03

Characteristics
- Type: (R)SB(r)a:
- Apparent size (V): 1.0' × 0.7'

Other designations
- ESO 412- G 014, MCG -05-04-007, 2MASX J01121922-3203399, 2MASXi J0112192-320341, ESO-LV 4120140, 6dF J0112192-320340, PGC 4333, PGC 697383.

NGC 427 is a spiral galaxy of type (R)SB(r)a: located in the constellation Sculptor. It was discovered on September 25, 1834, by John Herschel.

It was described by Dreyer as "3 very small (faint) stars with nebulosity (?)."
