= Gliese 1 =

Red dwarf star in the constellation of Sculptor

- Location of Gliese 1 in the constellation Sculptor

Observation data Epoch J2000 Equinox ICRS
- Constellation: Sculptor
- Right ascension: 00^{h} 05^{m} 24.42844^{s}
- Declination: −37° 21′ 26.5079″
- Apparent magnitude (V): 8.57

Characteristics
- Evolutionary stage: main sequence
- Spectral type: M2V
- U−B color index: +1.04
- B−V color index: +1.46
- Variable type: BY Dra

Astrometry
Radial velocity (R_{v})	+25.13±0.14 km/s
Proper motion (μ)	RA: +5,633.438 mas/yr Dec.: −2,334.721 mas/yr
Parallax (π)	230.0970±0.0362 mas
Distance	14.175 ± 0.002 ly (4.3460 ± 0.0007 pc)
Absolute magnitude (M_{V})	10.35

Details
Mass	0.33±0.07 M_{☉}
Radius	0.379±0.002 R_{☉}
Luminosity	0.015+0.007 −0.005 L_{☉}
Surface gravity (log g)	4.91 cgs
Temperature	3,616±14 K
Metallicity [Fe/H]	−0.26±0.09 dex
Rotation	60.1±5.7 d
Rotational velocity (v sin i)	4.8 km/s
Age	8.27 Gyr

Other designations
- NSV 15017, CD−37°15492, CPD−37°9435, GC 49, GJ 1, HD 225213, HIP 439, SAO 192348, G 267-25, LFT 5, LHS 1, LPM 904, LTT 23, NLTT 134, PLX 5817.00

Database references
SIMBAD	data
ARICNS	data

Gliese 1 is a red dwarf in the constellation Sculptor, which is found in the southern celestial hemisphere. It is one of the closest stars to the Sun, at a distance of 14.2 light years. Because of its proximity to the Earth it is a frequent object of study and much is known about its physical properties and composition. However, with an apparent magnitude of about 8.6 it is too faint to be seen with the naked eye.

== History ==
This star's high proper motion was first documented by Benjamin Gould in 1885. At that time the star was identified as Cordoba Z.C. 23h 1584. As it lies very close to the origin of the astronomical right ascension coordinates during the 1950 epoch, it became the first star in both the Gliese Catalogue of Nearby Stars and the Luyten Half-Second star catalogues.

== Properties ==
The stellar classification of this star has been rated from M1.5V to M4.0V by various sources. Gliese 1 is estimated to have 33% of the Sun's mass and 38% of the Sun's radius.

This star is suspected of being a BY Draconis-type variable star with the provisional variable star designation NSV 15017. It is also suspected of being a flare star. Like other flare stars, it emits X-rays. The temperatures of the layers of the atmosphere of this star have been measured.

This star has been examined for an orbiting companion using speckle interferometry in the near infrared part of the spectrum. However, no companion was found to a magnitude limit of 10.5 at 1 AU from the primary, out to a magnitude limit of 12.5 at 10 AU. Radial velocity measurements have likewise failed to reveal the presence of a companion orbiting this star. This search excludes a planet with a few Earth masses orbiting in the habitable zone, or a Jupiter-mass planet orbiting at a radius of 1 AU or less. The radial velocity shows little or no variability, with a measurement precision of less than 20 m/s.

The space velocity components of this star are U = +77.2, V = -99.5 and W = −35.6 km/s. It is orbiting through the Milky Way galaxy with an orbital eccentricity of 0.45, and a distance from the galactic core that varies from 3,510 to 9,150 parsecs. By comparison, the Sun is currently 8,500 parsecs from the core. Stars with high peculiar velocities are termed runaway stars. This star has a high peculiar velocity of 111.3 km/s, and the velocity vector for this star may link it with the Tucana-Horologium and/or the AB Doradus stellar associations.
