= USS Sculptor =

Cargo ship of the United States Navy

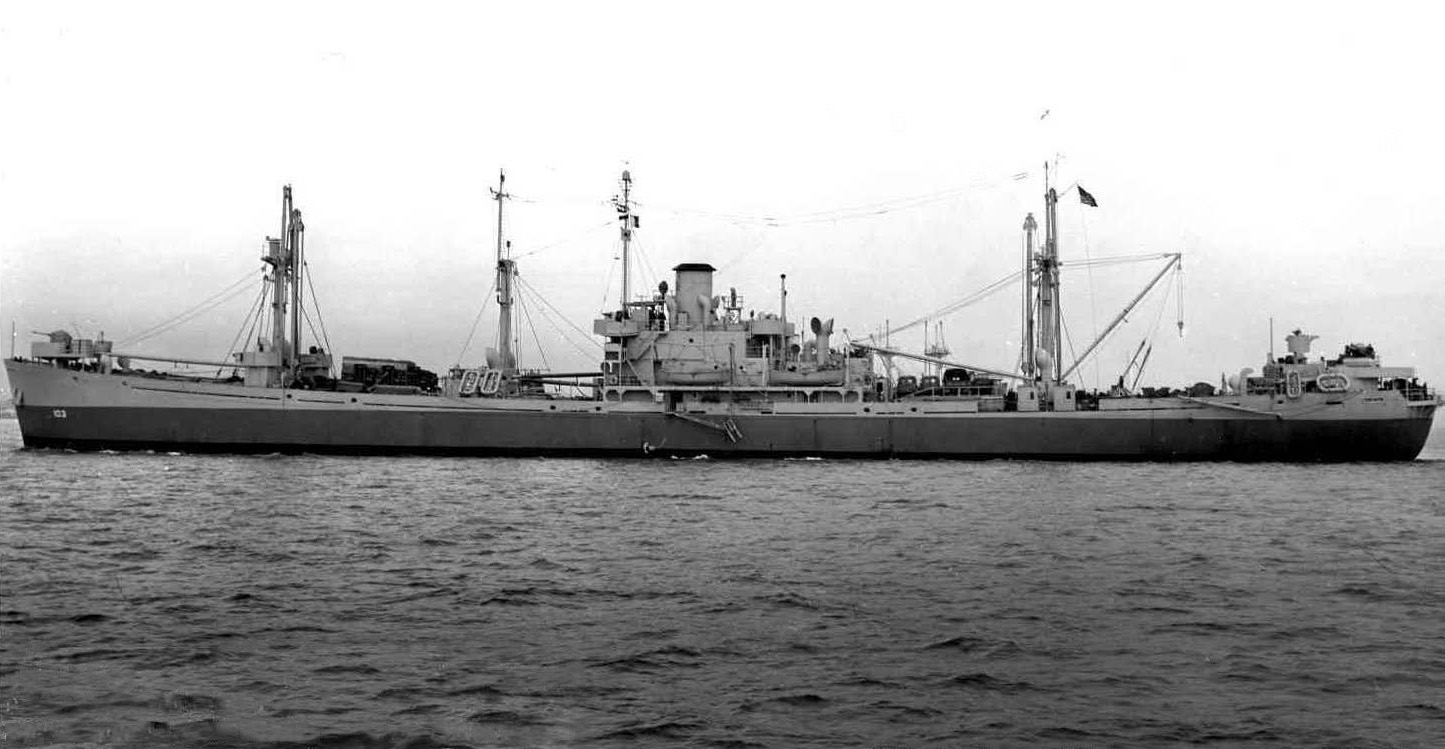
- USS Sculptor (AK-103), underway in San Francisco Bay, 13 December 1944.

History

United States
- Name: D. W. Harrington; Sculptor
- Namesake: D. W. Harrington; The constellation Sculptor
- Ordered: as a Type EC2-S-C1 hull, MCE hull 1671
- Builder: California Shipbuilding Corporation, Terminal Island, Los Angeles, California
- Yard number: 204
- Way number: 10
- Laid down: 18 May 1943
- Launched: 10 June 1943
- Sponsored by: Mrs. S. E. Joseph
- Acquired: 22 June 1943
- Commissioned: 10 August 1943
- Decommissioned: 26 February 1946
- Stricken: 12 March 1947
- Identification: Hull symbol: AK-103; Code letters: NTTT
- Fate: Returned to MARCOM, 8 March 1946, sold 15 January 1947

Greece
- Name: Dimosthenis Pantaleon
- Owner: P. & V. Pantaleon
- Acquired: 27 January 1947
- Fate: Scrapped, 1969

General characteristics
- Class & type: Crater-class cargo ship
- Type: Type EC2-S-C1
- Displacement: 4,023 long tons (4,088 t) (standard); 14,550 long tons (14,780 t) (full load)
- Length: 441 ft 6 in (134.57 m)
- Beam: 56 ft 11 in (17.35 m)
- Draft: 28 ft 4 in (8.64 m)
- Installed power: 2 × Western Pipe and Steel Company header-type boilers, 220psi 450°; 2,500 shp (1,900 kW)
- Propulsion: 1 × Iron Fireman triple-expansion reciprocating steam engine; 1 × shaft
- Speed: 12.5 kn (23.2 km/h; 14.4 mph)
- Capacity: 7,800 t (7,700 long tons) DWT; 444,206 cu ft (12,578.5 m^{3}) (non-refrigerated)
- Complement: 16 officers 190 enlisted
- Armament: 1 × 5 in (127 mm)/38 caliber dual purpose (DP) gun; 1 × 3 in (76 mm)/50 caliber DP gun; 2 × 40 mm (1.57 in) Bofors anti-aircraft (AA) gun mounts; 8 × 20 mm (0.79 in) Oerlikon cannons AA gun mounts

USS Sculptor (AK-103) was a Crater-class cargo ship commissioned by the US Navy for service in World War II. Sculptor was named after the constellation Sculptor. She was responsible for delivering troops, goods and equipment to locations in the Asiatic-Pacific Theater.

== Construction ==
Sculptor was laid down 18 May 1943, under Maritime Commission (MARCOM) contract, MC hull No. 1671, as the Liberty ship SS D. W. Harrington, by California Shipbuilding Corporation, Terminal Island, Los Angeles, California; launched on 10 June 1943; sponsored by Mrs. S. E. Joseph; acquired by the Navy on 22 June 1943; and commissioned on 10 August 1943.

== Service history ==
Sculptor served in the Naval Transportation Service (NTS), making six voyages from San Francisco, California, supplying advanced bases in the western Pacific. She sailed on her first voyage on 28 August 1943, towing a section of the floating dock, ABSD-1, and delivered it and other cargo at Espiritu Santo on 2 October. After carrying Lend-Lease material to New Zealand, she returned to San Francisco on 23 November.

On her second voyage, beginning on 27 December, she towed a repair barge, YRDH-1, and carried a deck cargo of an LCT in sections to Espiritu Santo. After arriving there on 1 February 1944, she made voyages between advanced bases until departing from Espiritu Santo on 20 April, for San Francisco, where she arrived on 12 May.

Sculptor's remaining voyages followed the pattern of the first two. She sailed from San Francisco on 3 June, with a section of ABSD-2 in tow, and made local cargo voyages in the Southwest Pacific between 15 July and 29 September, before returning to San Francisco on 24 October.

After overhaul, she sailed again on 16 December, with two YF (covered barges) in tow which she exchanged at Pearl Harbor for YFD-64. This large dry dock was delivered by the combined efforts of Sculptor, and a sister ship, at San Pedro Bay, Leyte, Philippine Islands, on 13 February 1945. Sculptor then carried cargo between advanced bases until 28 April, and returned to San Francisco on 21 May.

On 15 June 1945, the cargo ship left San Diego with two 83' US Coast Guard cutters on deck and a barge in tow. The tow was dropped at Pearl Harbor, and the remainder of the cargo was offloaded at Saipan after arrival on 13 July.

The ship returned to San Francisco on 1 September, and began her sixth and last Navy voyage on 29 September. She delivered cargo to Saipan and Guam, and sailed from Guam on 23 December, for the East Coast of the United States.

== Post-war decommissioning ==
Sculptor arrived at Baltimore, Maryland, on 21 February 1946, and was decommissioned there on 26 February. The ship was redelivered to MARCOM on 8 March, and struck from the Navy List on 12 March 1946.

On 15 January 1947, she was sold to the Greek shipping firm P. & V. Pantaleon for $544,506. She was removed from the National Defense Reserve Fleet, James River Group, Lee Hall, Virginia, on 27 January 1947. She was renamed SS Dimosthenis Pantaleon, under which name she remained in service until she was scrapped at Trieste, Italy, in 1969.

== Awards ==
Sculptor's crew members were eligible for the following medals:

- American Campaign Medal
- Asiatic-Pacific Campaign Medal
- World War II Victory Medal

== Notes ==
Citations

== Bibliography ==
Online resources

- "Sculptor". Dictionary of American Naval Fighting Ships. Naval History and Heritage Command. This article incorporates text from this source, which is in the public domain.
- "California Shipbuilding, Los Angeles CA". www.ShipbuildingHistory.com. 13 October 2010.
- "USS Sculptor (AK-103)". NavSource. 14 September 2013.
- "D. W. HARRINGTON". United States Department of Transportation. Archived from the original on December 12, 2019.
