= NGC 534 =

Galaxy in the constellation Sculptor

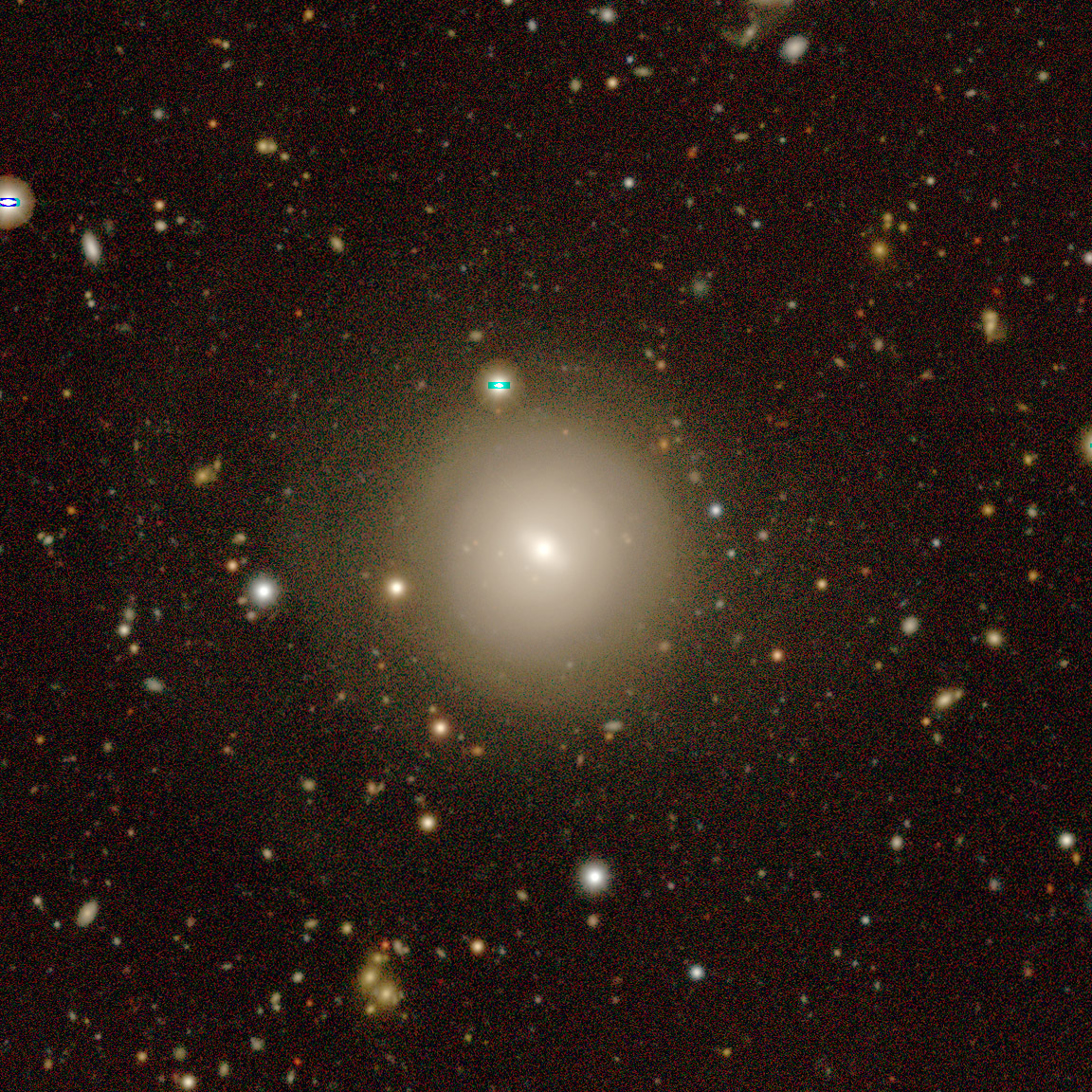
- NGC 534 (legacy surveys)

Observation data (J2000 epoch)
- Constellation: Sculptor
- Right ascension: 01^{h} 24^{m} 44.615^{s}
- Declination: −38° 07′ 44.74″
- Redshift: 0.019417
- Heliocentric radial velocity: 5765 km/s
- Distance: 255 Mly (78.1 Mpc)
- Apparent magnitude (B): 14.42

Characteristics
- Type: S0

Other designations
- MCG -06-04-026, PGC 5215

NGC 534 is a lenticular galaxy located in the constellation of Sculptor about 260 million light years from the Milky Way. It was discovered by the British astronomer John Herschel in 1835.

== See also ==
- List of NGC objects (1–1000)
