= Eta Sculptoris =

Star in the constellation Sculptoris

- Location of η Sculptoris (circled)

Observation data Epoch J2000 Equinox ICRS
- Constellation: Sculptor
- Right ascension: 00^{h} 27^{m} 55.69820^{s}
- Declination: −33° 00′ 25.7900″
- Apparent magnitude (V): 4.8 - 4.9

Characteristics
- Evolutionary stage: asymptotic giant branch
- Spectral type: M4III
- U−B color index: +1.81
- B−V color index: +1.64
- Variable type: SRS

Astrometry
Radial velocity (R_{v})	+12.1±1.7 km/s
Proper motion (μ)	RA: −20.349 mas/yr Dec.: −49.911 mas/yr
Parallax (π)	7.0975±0.2769 mas
Distance	460 ± 20 ly (141 ± 5 pc)
Absolute magnitude (M_{V})	−0.83

Details
Radius	79.96+3.70 −9.85 R_{☉}
Luminosity	1,012.3±44.6 L_{☉}
Temperature	3,641+247 −82 K

Other designations
- η Scl, CD−33°152, FK5 2026, GC 544, HD 2429, HIP 2210, HR 105, SAO 192545, GSC 06994-01104

Database references
SIMBAD	data

Eta Sculptoris, Latinized from η Sculptoris, is a single, variable star in the central part of the southern constellation of Sculptor. It is visible to the naked eye as a faint, red-hued star with an apparent visual magnitude that fluctuates around 4.81. The star is located approximately 460 light years from the Sun based on parallax, and is drifting further away with a radial velocity of +12 km/s.

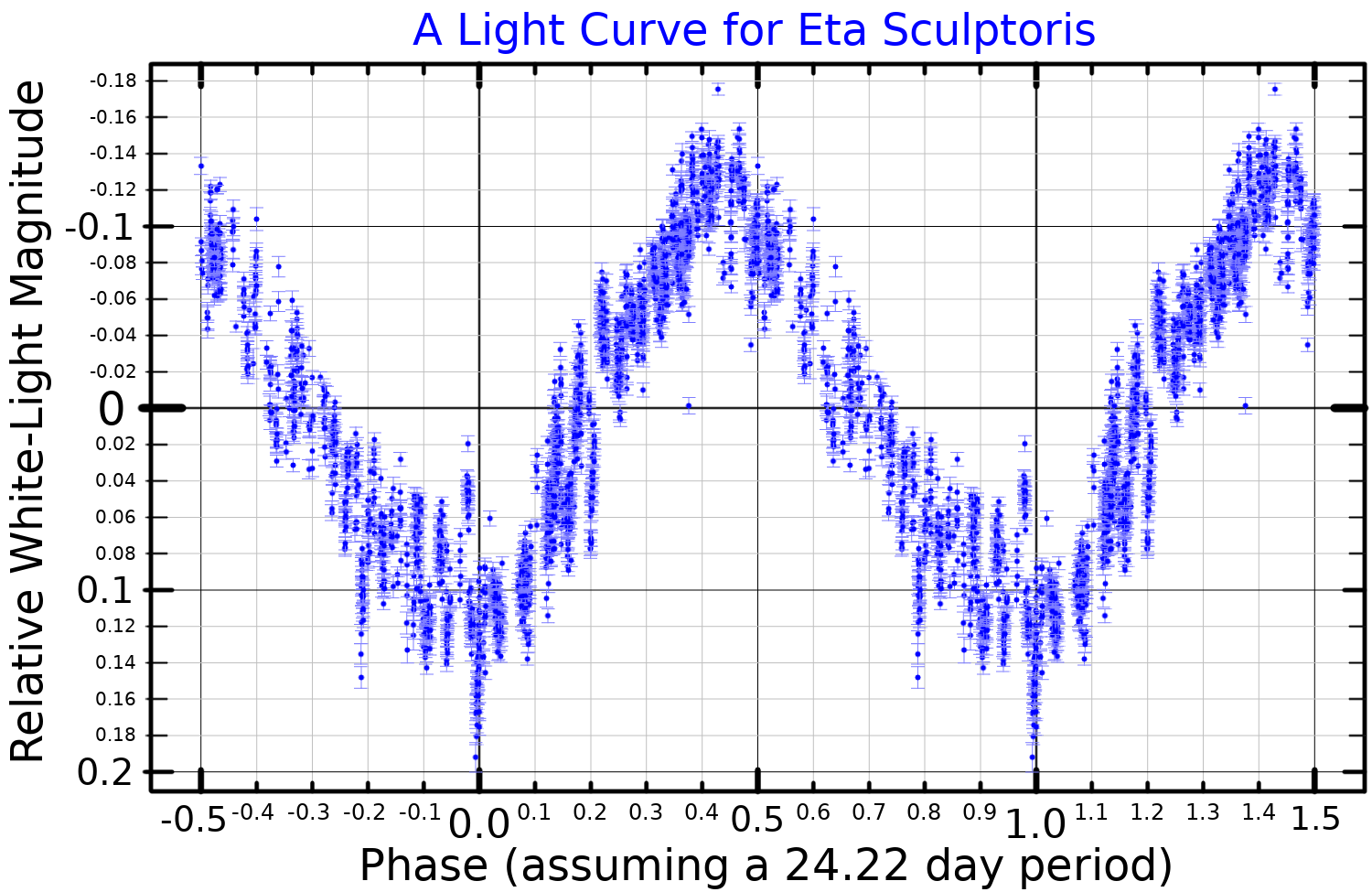
A light curve for Eta Sculptoris, plotted from MASCARA data folded with the best-fit period of 24.22 days

This object is an aging red giant star, currently on the asymptotic giant branch, with a stellar classification of M4III. With the supply of hydrogen at its core exhausted, the star has cooled and expanded. It now has 80 times the radius of the Sun. Eta Sculptoris is classified as a semiregular variable with a visual magnitude that fluctuates between +4.80 and +4.90, The pulsations have periods of 22.7, 23.5, 24.6, 47.3, 128.7 and 158.7 days. On average, this star is radiating over a thousand times the luminosity of the Sun from its enlarged photosphere at an effective temperature of 3,641 K.
