= R Sculptoris =

Variable star in the constellation Sculptor

- Location of R Sculptoris (circled)

Observation data Epoch J2000.0 Equinox ICRS
- Constellation: Sculptor
- Right ascension: 01^{h} 26^{m} 58.09462^{s}
- Declination: −32° 32′ 35.4377″
- Apparent magnitude (V): +5.5 - 8.0

Characteristics
- Evolutionary stage: AGB
- Spectral type: C6,5ea(Np)
- U−B color index: +7.67
- B−V color index: +3.87
- Variable type: SRb

Astrometry
Radial velocity (R_{v})	−5.40 km/s
Proper motion (μ)	RA: −9.784 mas/yr Dec.: −30.900 mas/yr
Parallax (π)	2.2724±0.1471 mas
Distance	1,180±140 ly (361±44 pc)
Absolute magnitude (M_{V})	−0.45

Details
Mass	1.3±0.7 M_{☉}
Radius	411±43 R_{☉}
Luminosity	8,000±1,000 L_{☉}
Surface gravity (log g)	−0.5±0.1 cgs
Temperature	2640±80 K
Metallicity [Fe/H]	0.0 dex

Other designations
- R Scl, CD−33°525, HD 8879, HIP 6759, HR 423, SAO 193122, WDS J01270-3233A, AAVSO 0122-33

Database references
SIMBAD	data

R Sculptoris is a variable star system in the southern constellation of Sculptor. Parallax measurements provide a distance estimate of approximately 1,435 ± 98 light-years from the Sun. An independent estimate based on measurements of an ejected shell surrounding the star yield a distance of 1,180 ± 140 light-years. The star is drifting closer with a radial velocity of −5.4 km/s.

Benjamin Apthorp Gould discovered that the star's brightness varies, in 1872. It was listed with its variable star designation, R Sculptoris, in Annie Jump Cannon's 1907 work Second Catalog of Variable Stars. Both AAVSO and ASAS data shows that R Sculptoris is occasionally brighter than 6th magnitude, and faintly visible to the naked eye under excellent observing conditions.

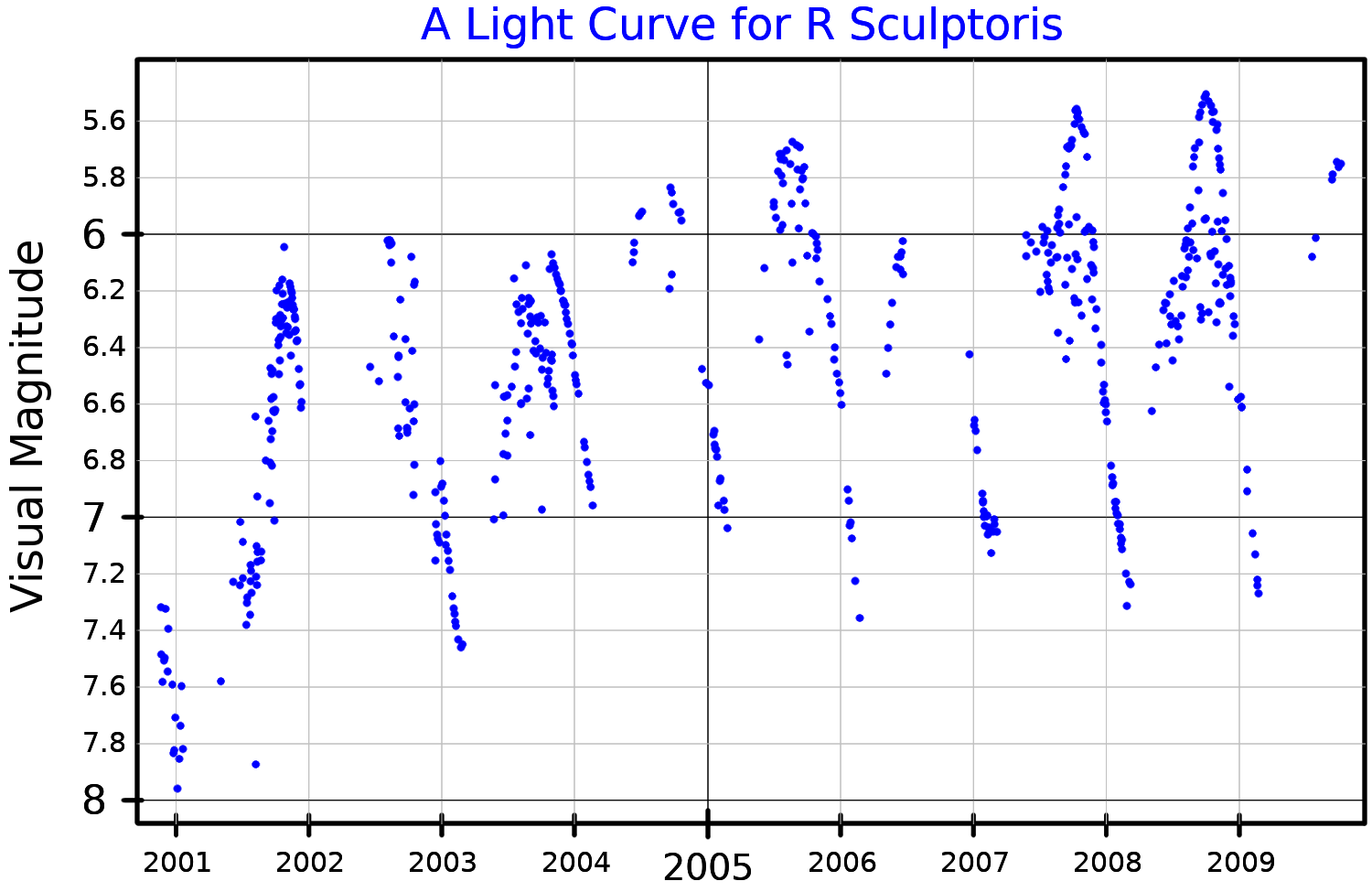
A visual band light curve for R Sculptoris, plotted from ASAS data

This is an aging giant star on the asymptotic giant branch with a stellar classification of C6,5ea(Np), which indicates a carbon-rich atmosphere. It is a semi-regular pulsating star of the SRb type that is nearing the end of its fusing lifespan. A sine curve fitted to the last ten pulsation cycles prior to 2017 give a pulsation period of 376 days with an amplitude of 0.75 magnitude. The star is shedding its outer atmosphere, and it is surrounded by a thin shell of dust and gas that was created during the most recent thermal pulse around 2,000 years ago.

Observations have revealed a spiral structure in the material around the star. The spiral is suspected to be caused by an unseen companion star. The spiral windings are consistent with an orbital period of ~350 years.

== Gallery ==
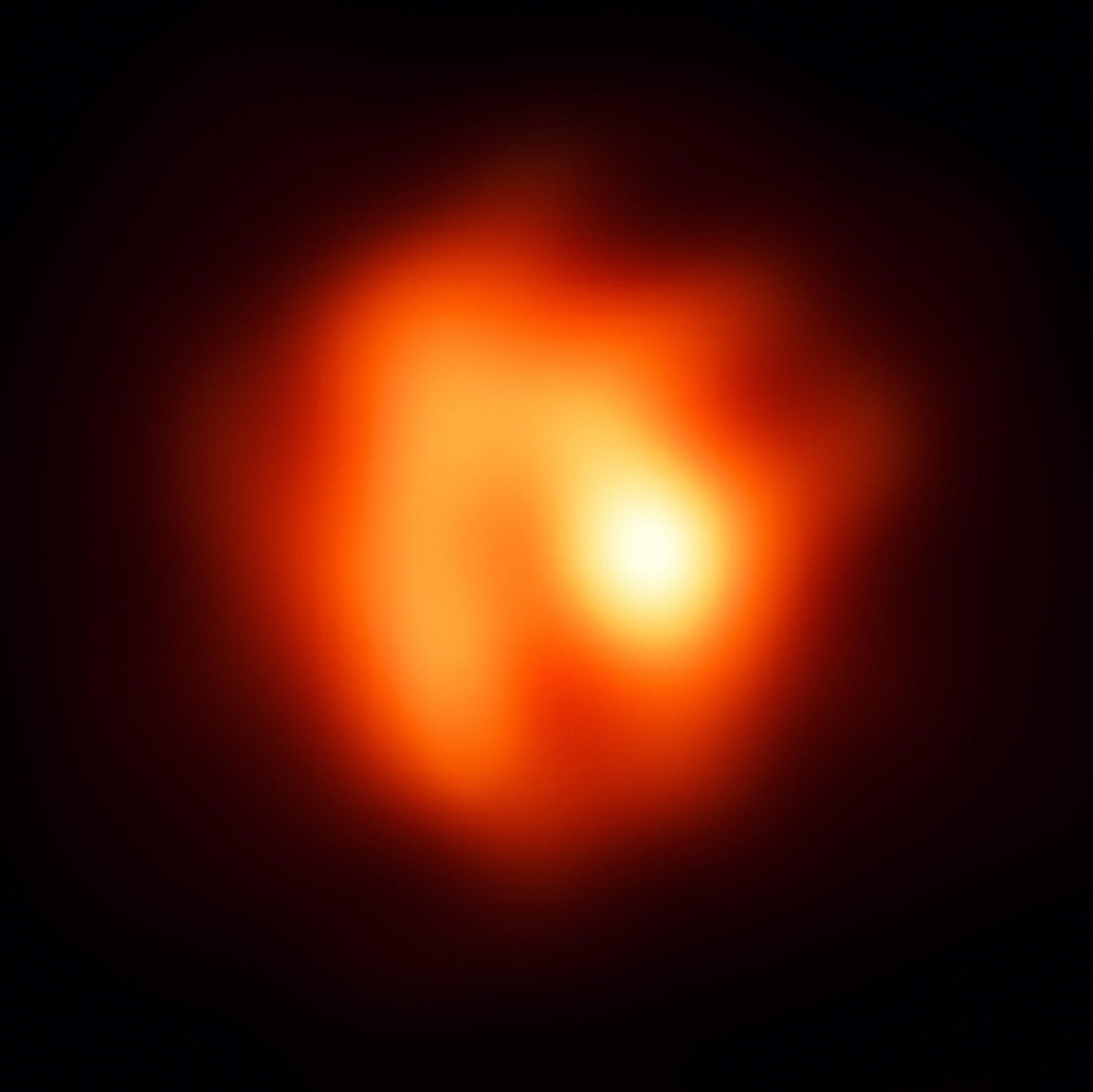
This image captures approximately 20x20 milliarcseconds.

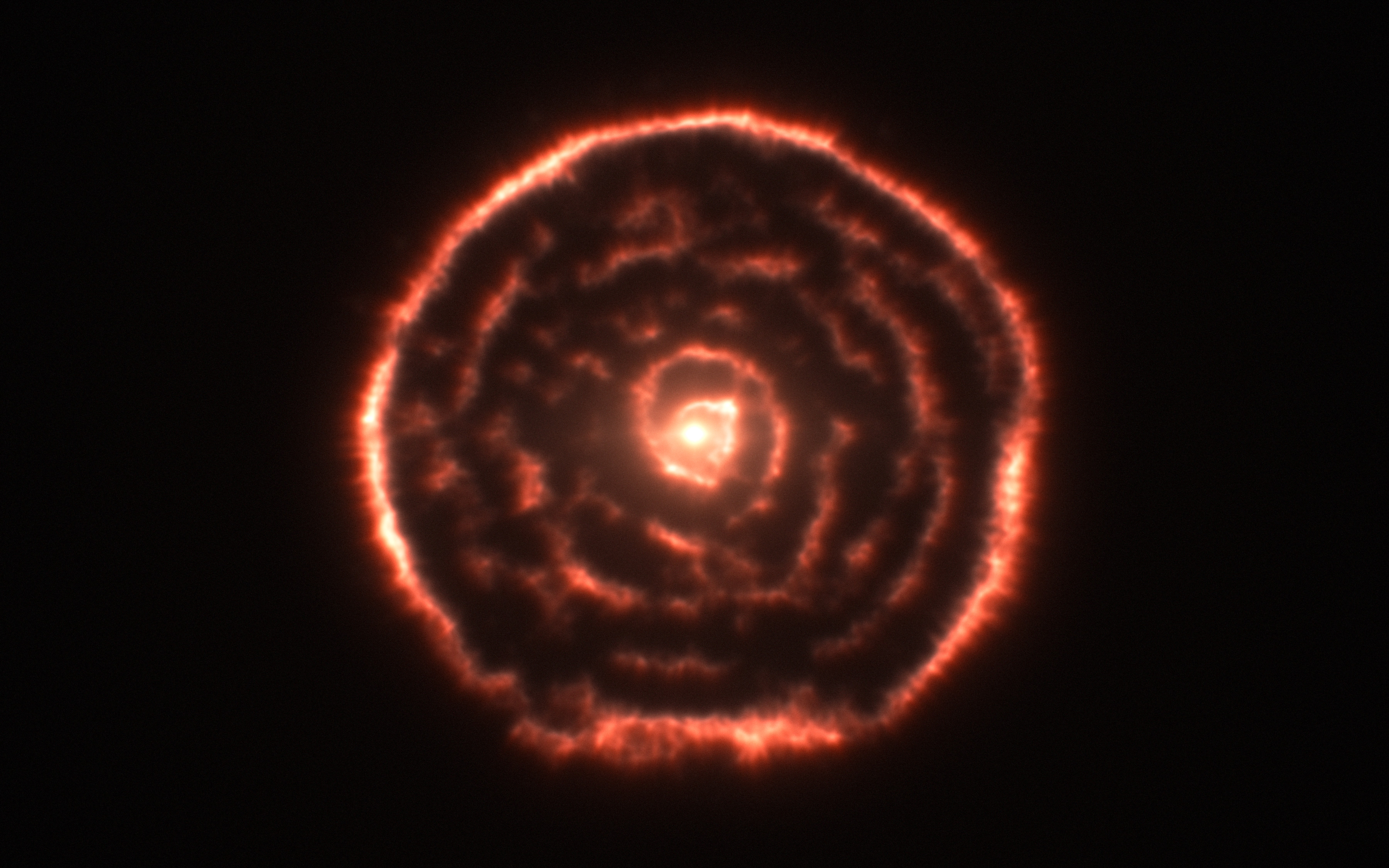
Spiral spotted by ALMA around the star (data visualisation).

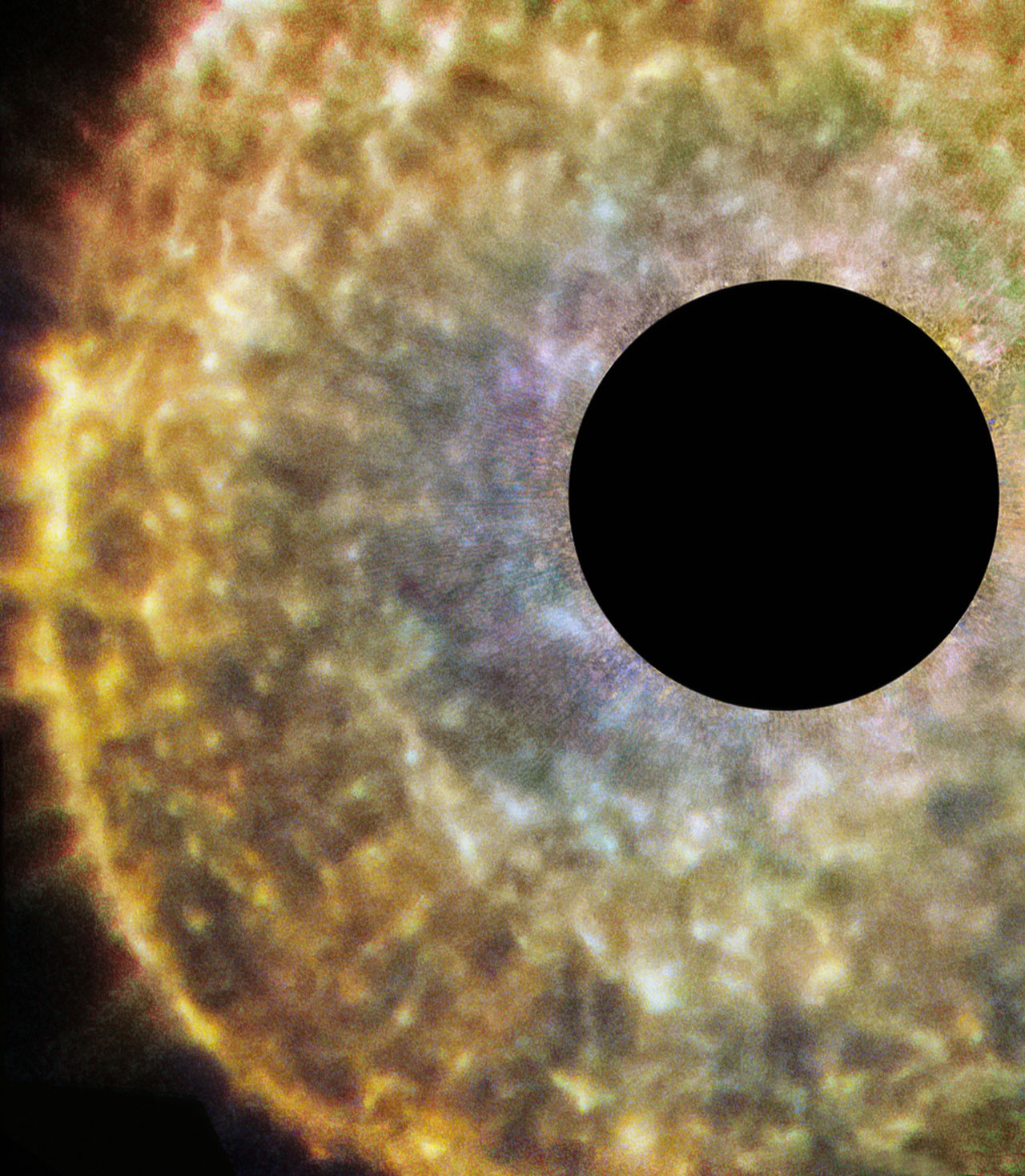
R Sculptoris and its hidden companion, taken by Hubble Space Telescope
