= NGC 441 =

Galaxy in the constellation of Sculptor

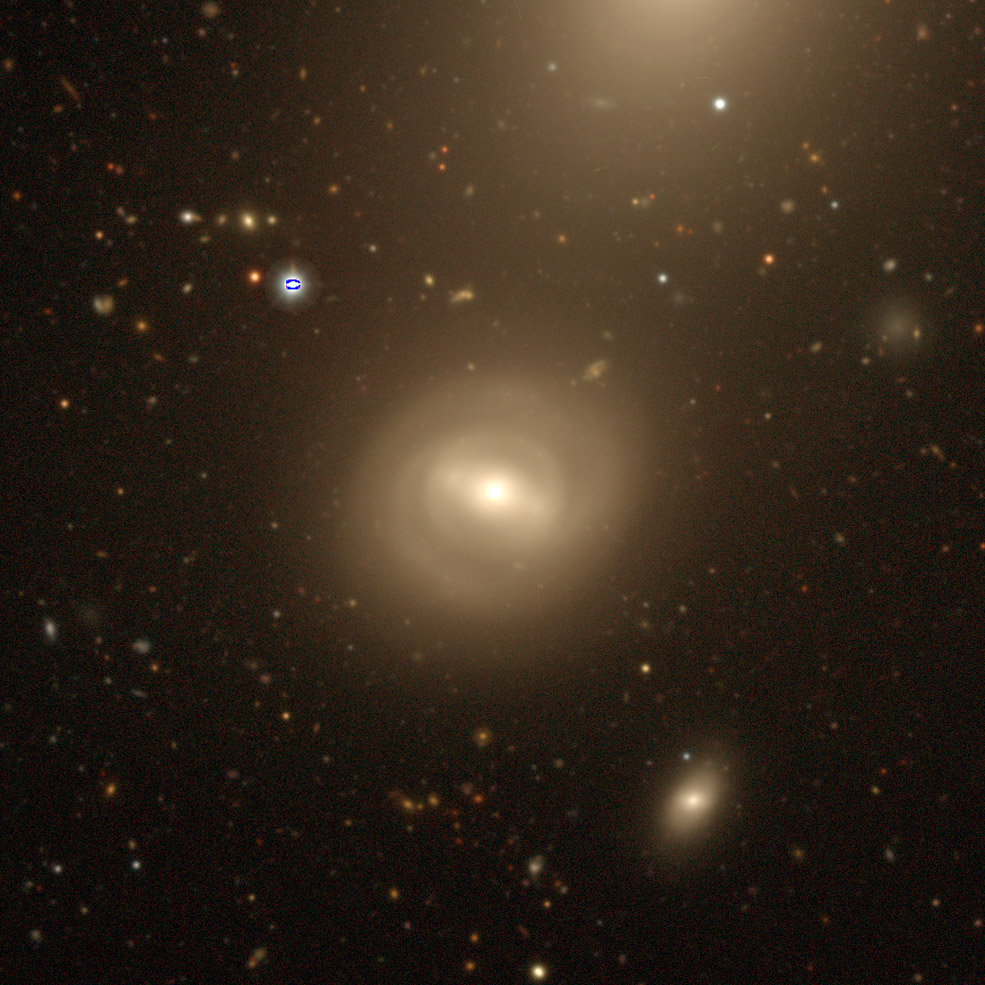
- NGC 441 imaged by Legacy Surveys

Observation data (J2000 epoch)
- Constellation: Sculptor
- Right ascension: 01^{h} 13^{m} 51.2626^{s}
- Declination: −31° 47′ 18.151″
- Redshift: 0.018800
- Heliocentric radial velocity: 5,636 km/s
- Apparent magnitude (V): 13.62
- Absolute magnitude (V): -22.19

Characteristics
- Type: (R')SB0/a?(rs)
- Size: ~161,600 ly (49.54 kpc) (estimated)
- Apparent size (V): 1.4′ × 1.1′

Other designations
- ESO 412- G 019, IRAS F01115-3202, 2MASX J01135125-3147180, MCG -05-04-016, PGC 4429, 701033

NGC 441 is a lenticular galaxy of type (R')SB(rs)0/a? located in the constellation Sculptor. It was discovered on September 27, 1834, by British astronomer John Herschel. It was described by Dreyer as "pretty faint, small, round, gradually brighter middle."

One supernova has been observed in NGC 441: SN 2024agld (type Ia, mag. 18.947) was discovered by ATLAS on December 31, 2024.

== See also ==
- List of NGC objects (1–1000)
