= Sculptor (constellation) =

Constellation in the southern celestial hemisphere

- Constellation
- List of stars in Sculptor
- Abbreviation: Scl
- Genitive: Sculptoris
- Pronunciation: /ˈskʌlptər/ SKULP-tər, genitive /skəlpˈtɔːrɪs/ skəlp-TOR-iss
- Symbolism: the Sculptor
- Right ascension: 0^{h}
- Declination: −30°
- Quadrant: SQ1
- Area: 475 sq. deg. (36th)
- Main stars: 5
- Bayer/Flamsteed stars: 18
- Stars with planets: 6
- Stars brighter than 3.00^{m}: 0
- Stars within 10.00 pc (32.62 ly): 2
- Brightest star: α Scl (4.30^{m})
- Nearest star: Gliese 1
- Messier objects: 0
- Bordering constellations: Cetus; Aquarius; Piscis Austrinus; Grus; Phoenix; Fornax
- Visible at latitudes between +50° and −90°. Best visible at 21:00 (9 p.m.) during the month of November.

Sculptor is a faint constellation in the southern sky. It represents a sculptor. It was introduced by Nicolas Louis de Lacaille in the 18th century. He originally named it Apparatus Sculptoris (the sculptor's studio), but the name was later shortened.

== History ==
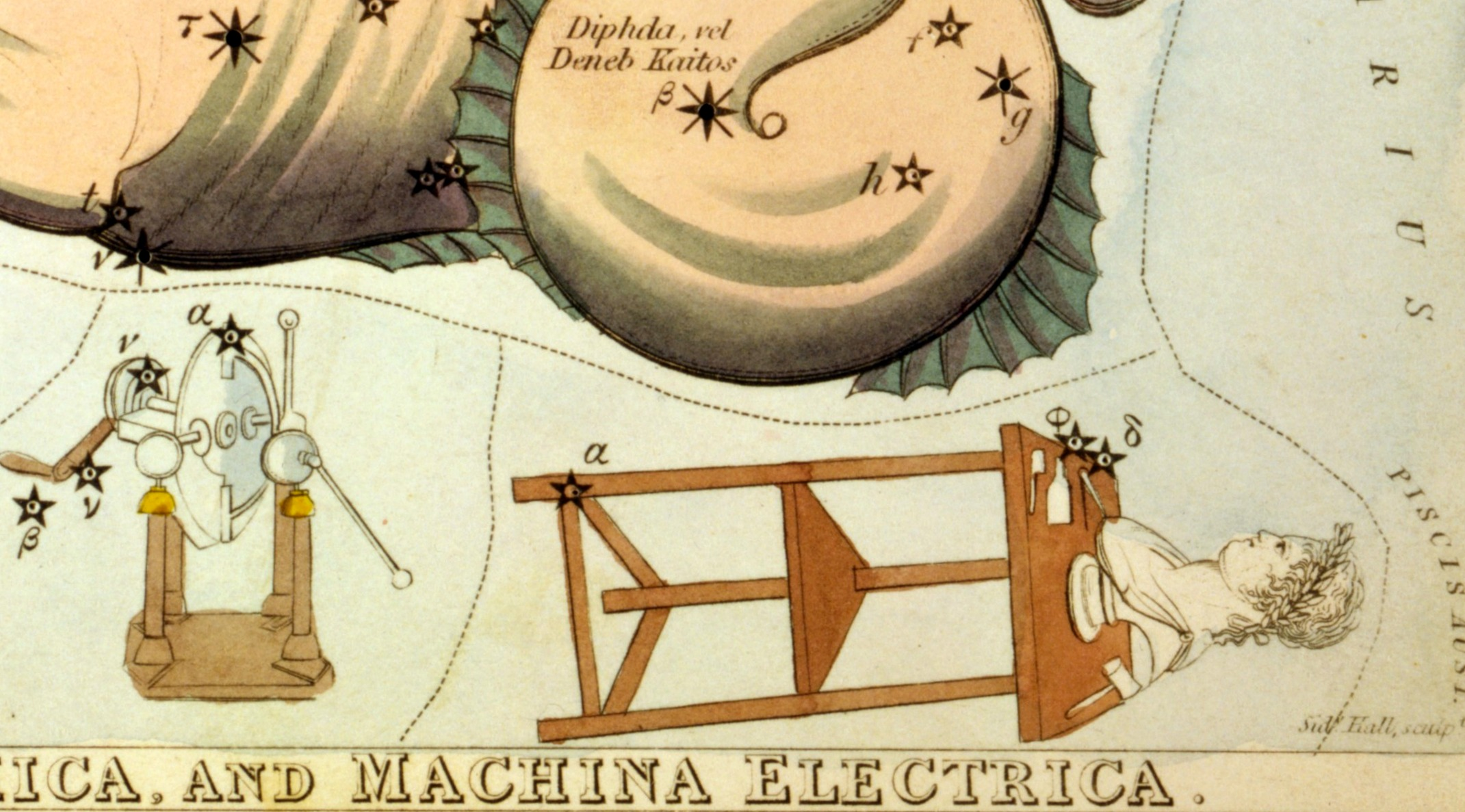
Artistic rendition of the sculptor's studio, along with parts of the neighbouring constellations of Cetus and Machina Electrica, in Urania's Mirror (1825)

The region to the south of Cetus and Aquarius had been named by Aratus in 270 BC as The Waters – an area of scattered faint stars with two brighter stars standing out. Professor of astronomy Bradley Schaefer has proposed that these stars were most likely Alpha and Delta Sculptoris.

The French astronomer Nicolas-Louis de Lacaille first described the constellation in French as l'Atelier du Sculpteur (the sculptor's studio) in 1751–52, depicting a three-legged table with a carved head on it, and an artist's mallet and two chisels on a block of marble alongside it. Lacaille had observed and catalogued almost 10,000 southern stars during a two-year stay at the Cape of Good Hope, devising fourteen new constellations in uncharted regions of the Southern Celestial Hemisphere not visible from Europe. He named all but one in honour of instruments that symbolised the Age of Enlightenment. (Note: The exception is Mensa, named for the Table Mountain. The other thirteen (alongside Sculptor) are Antlia, Caelum, Circinus, Fornax, Horologium, Microscopium, Norma, Octans, Pictor, Pyxis, Reticulum and Telescopium.)

== Characteristics ==
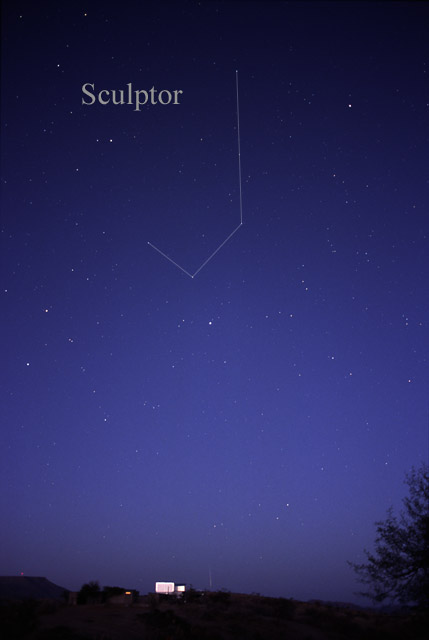
The constellation of Sculptor can be seen with the naked eye.

Sculptor is a small constellation bordered by Aquarius and Cetus to the north, Fornax to the east, Phoenix to the south, Grus to the southwest, and Piscis Austrinus to the west. The bright star Fomalhaut is nearby. The three-letter abbreviation for the constellation, as adopted by the International Astronomical Union in 1922, is "Scl". The official constellation boundaries, as set by Belgian astronomer Eugène Delporte in 1930, (Note: Delporte had proposed standardising the constellation boundaries to the International Astronomical Union, who had agreed and gave him the lead role) are defined by a polygon of 6 segments. In the equatorial coordinate system, the right ascension coordinates of these borders lie between 23^{h} 06.4^{m} and 01^{h} 45.5^{m} , while the declination coordinates are between −24.80° and −39.37°. The whole constellation is visible to observers south of latitude 50°N. (Note: While parts of the constellation technically rise above the horizon to observers between 50°N and 65°N, stars within a few degrees of the horizon are to all intents and purposes unobservable.)

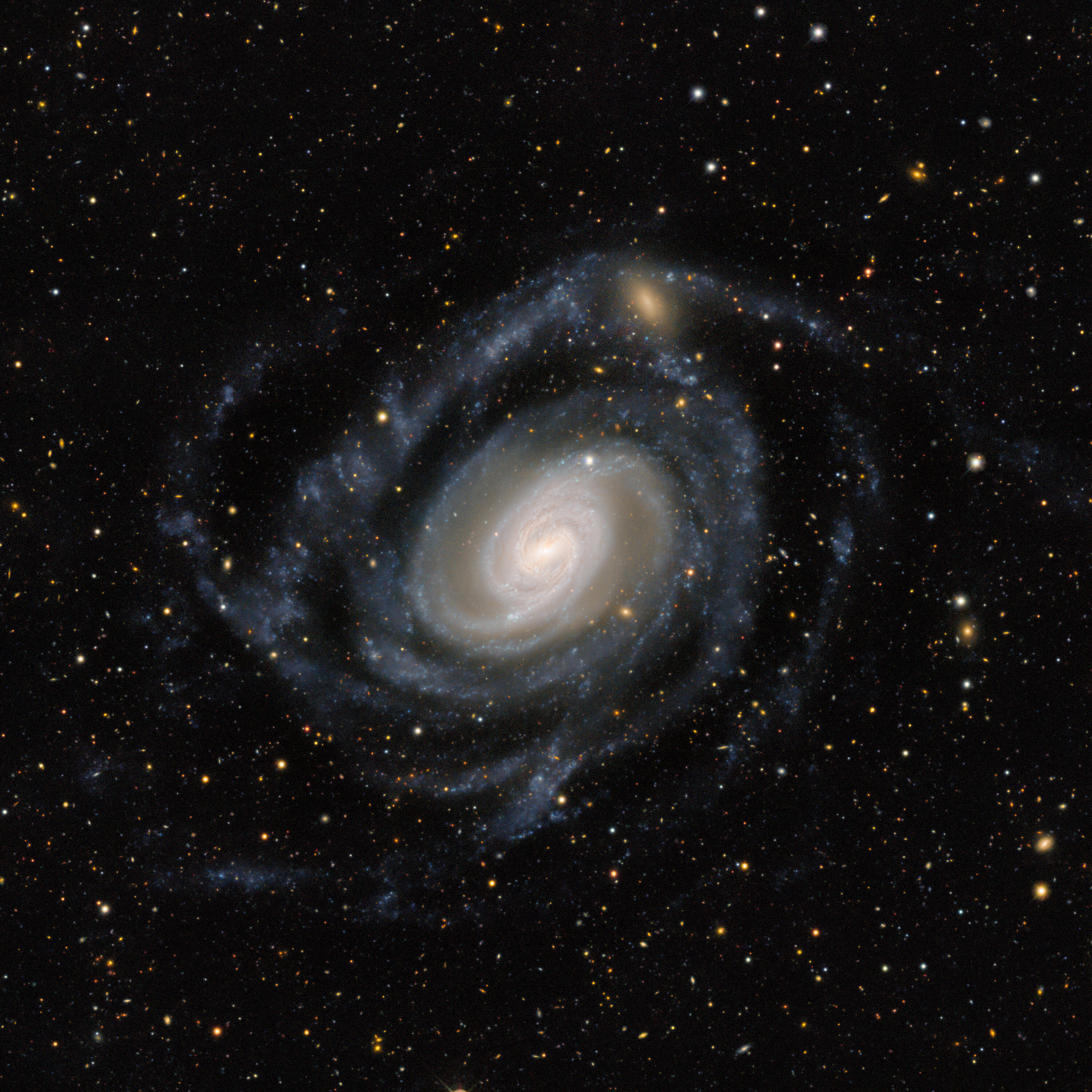
In the constellation Sculptor lies this large extended spiral galaxy called NGC 289. Despite being around 75 million light-years away, the light of NGC 289 is stunningly captured here by the Dark Energy Camera (DECam).

== Features ==
=== Stars ===
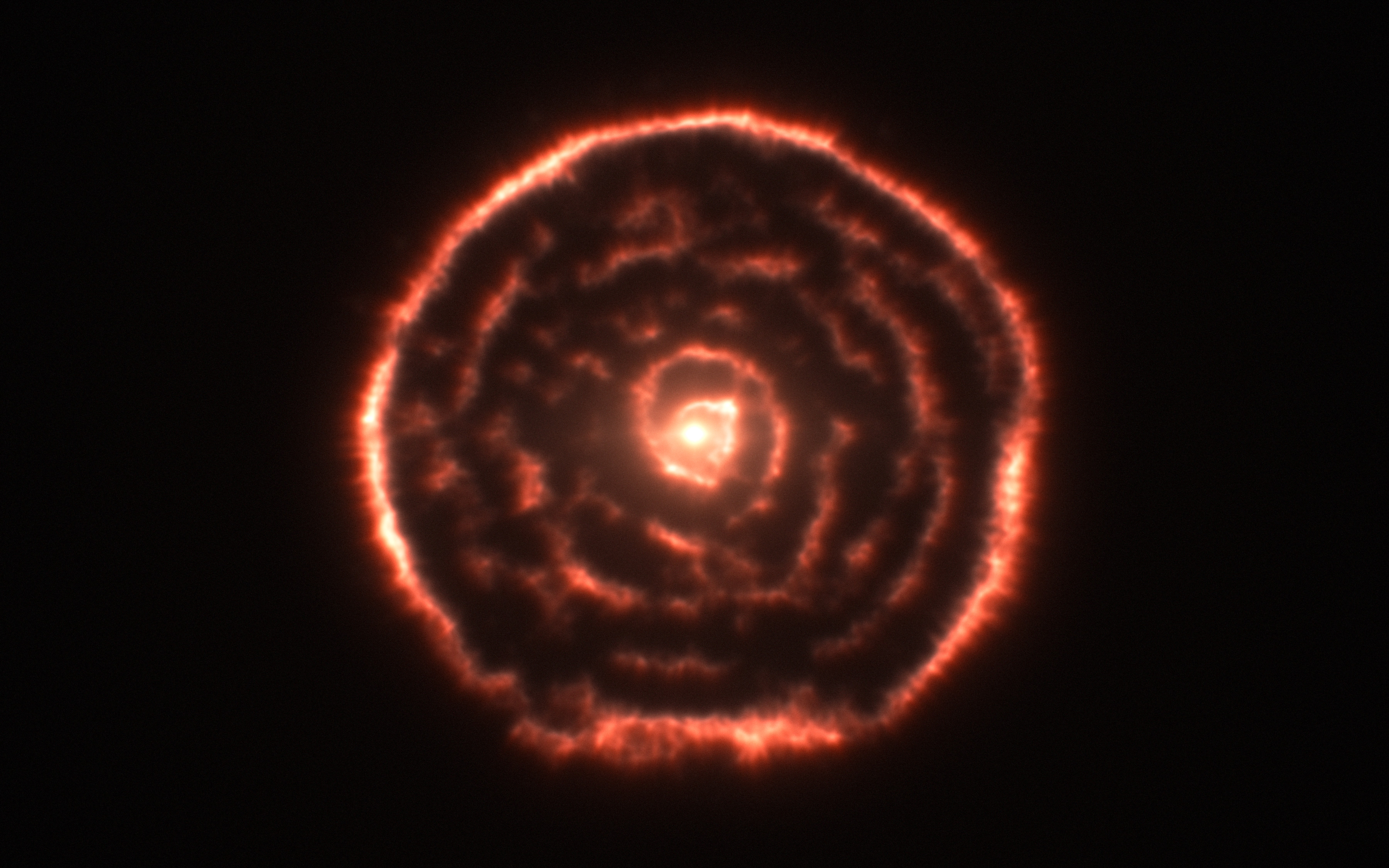
Curious spiral around red giant star R Sculptoris

Lacaille gave 19 stars Bayer designations Alpha through Tau in 1756, but omitted Omicron and Xi, and labelled two stars as Kappa and Lambda. Nu and Rho Sculptoris were dropped from star catalogues due to their faintness. In 1879, Benjamin Gould added Xi Sculptoris as he felt the star was bright enough to warrant a name.

No stars brighter than 3rd magnitude are located in Sculptor. This is partially explained by the fact that Sculptor contains the south galactic pole where stellar density is very low. Overall, there are 56 stars within the constellation's borders brighter than or equal to apparent magnitude 6.5. (Note: Objects of magnitude 6.5 are among the faintest visible to the unaided eye in suburban-rural transition night skies.)

The brightest star is Alpha Sculptoris, an SX Arietis-type variable star with a spectral type B7IIIp and an apparent magnitude of 4.3. It is 780 ± 30 light-years distant from Earth.

Eta Sculptoris is a red giant of spectral type M4III that varies between magnitudes 4.8 and 4.9, pulsating with multiple periods of 22.7, 23.5, 24.6, 47.3, 128.7 and 158.7 days. Estimated to be around 1,082 times as luminous as the Sun, it is 460 ± 20 light-years distant from Earth.

R Sculptoris is a red giant that has been found to be surrounded by spirals of matter likely ejected around 1800 years ago. It is 1,440 ± 90 light-years distant from Earth.

The Astronomical Society of Southern Africa in 2003 reported that observations of the Mira variable stars T, U, V and X Sculptoris were very urgently needed as data on their light curves was incomplete.

=== Deep-sky objects ===
The constellation also contains the Sculptor Dwarf, a dwarf galaxy which is a member of the Local Group, as well as the Sculptor Group, the group of galaxies closest to the Local Group. The Sculptor Galaxy (NGC 253), a barred spiral galaxy and the largest member of the group, lies near the border between Sculptor and Cetus. Another prominent member of the group is the irregular galaxy NGC 55.

One unique galaxy in Sculptor is the Cartwheel Galaxy, at a distance of 500 million light-years. The result of a merger around 300 million years ago, the Cartwheel Galaxy has a core of older, yellow stars, and an outer ring of younger, blue stars, which has a diameter of 100,000 light-years. The smaller galaxy in the collision is now incorporated into the core, after moving from a distance of 250,000 light-years. The shock waves from the collision sparked extensive star formation in the outer ring.

== Namesakes ==
Sculptor (AK-103) was a United States Navy Crater class cargo ship named after the constellation.

== See also ==
- Sculptor (Chinese astronomy)
